= Gjesing railway halt =

Railway halt in West Jutland, Denmark

Gjesing
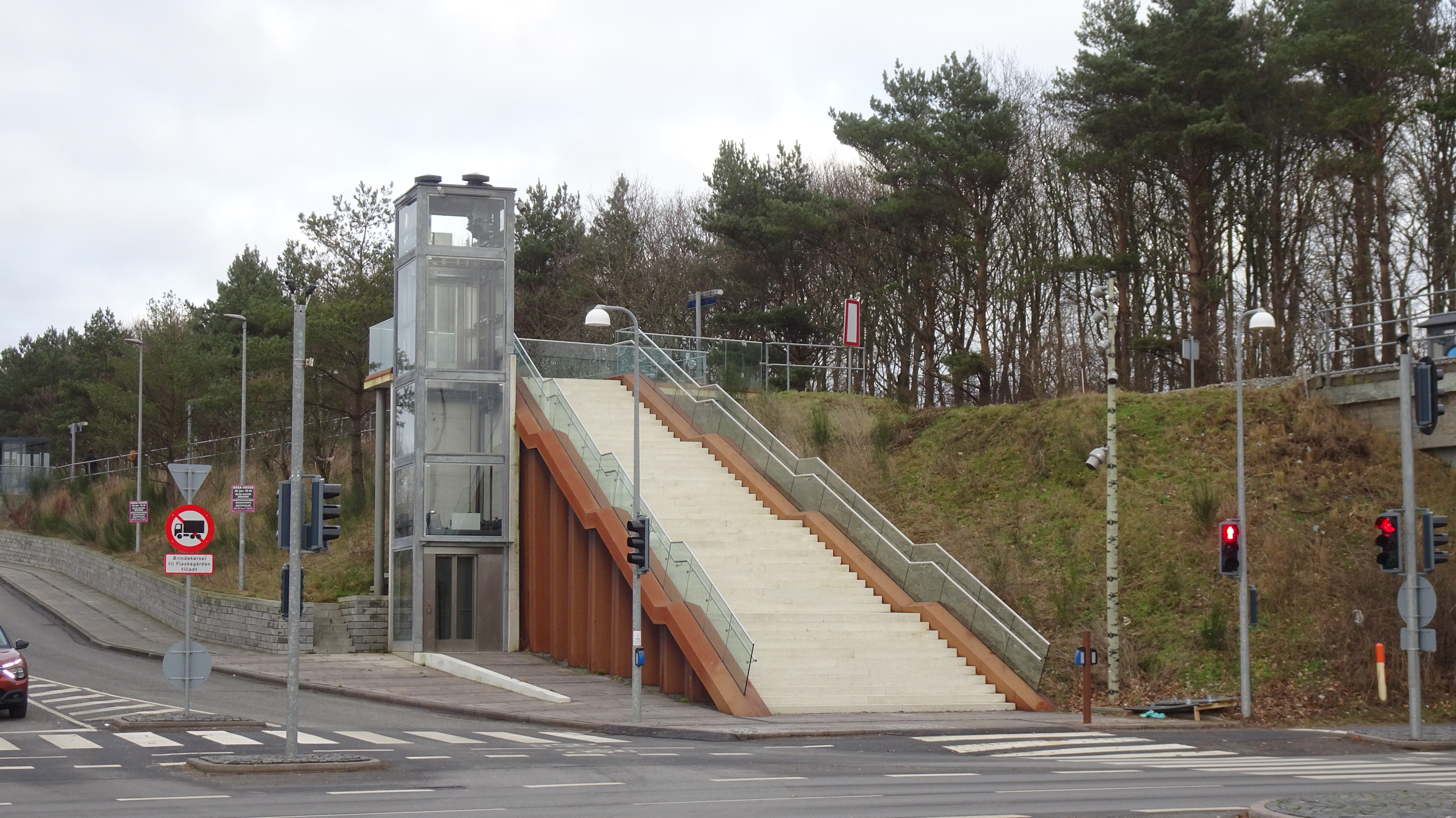
- Gjesing railway halt in 2023

General information
- Location: Stormgade 161; 6715 Esbjerg N Esbjerg Municipality; Denmark
- Coordinates: 55°30′34.51″N 8°27′26.23″E
- Elevation: 19.0 metres (62.3 ft)
- Owner: Banedanmark
- Line: Esbjerg-Struer railway line
- Platforms: 1
- Tracks: 1
- Train operators: GoCollective

Services
Preceding station	DSB Vores Tog	Following station
Spangsbjerg towards Esbjerg	Esbjerg–Skjern Regional train	Guldager towards Skjern
Spangsbjerg towards Esbjerg	Esbjerg–Nørre Nebel Local train	Guldager towards Nørre Nebel
Location

Gjesing railway halt is a railway halt serving the district of Gjesing in the northern part of the city of Esbjerg, Denmark.

Gjesing railway halt is located on the Esbjerg–Struer railway line from Esbjerg to Struer. It offers regional rail services to Esbjerg, Varde, Skjern, and Aarhus, as well as local train services to Oksbøl and Nørre Nebel, all operated by GoCollective.

== Services ==
The station offers direct regional rail services to Esbjerg, Varde, Skjern, Herning and Aarhus, as well as local train services to Oksbøl and Nørre Nebel, all operated by the private public transport operating company GoCollective.

== See also ==
- List of railway stations in Denmark
- Rail transport in Denmark
