= Guldager railway station =

Railway station in West Jutland, Denmark

Guldager
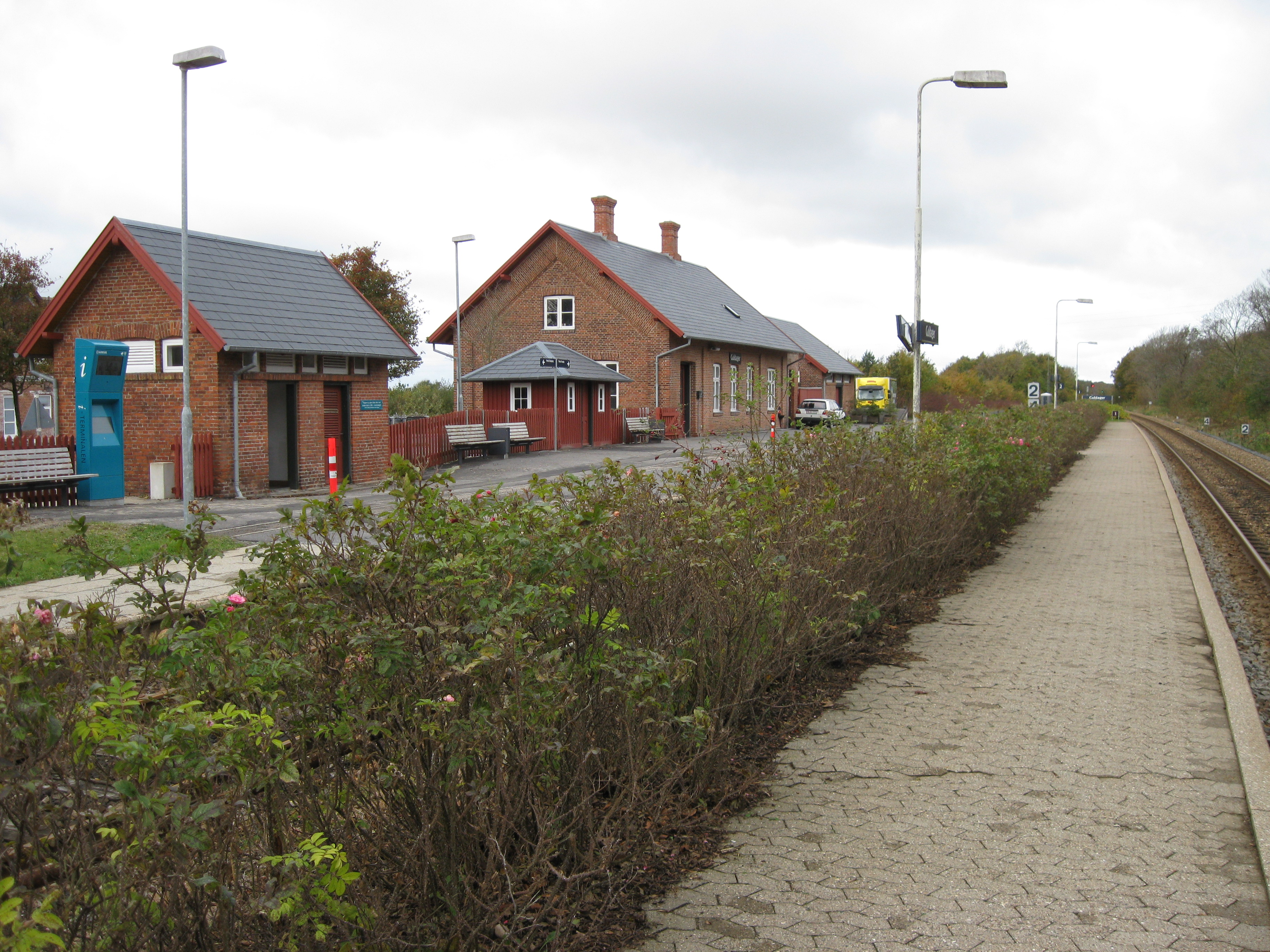
- Guldager station in 2010

General information
- Location: Guldager Stationsvej 101; 6710 Esbjerg V Esbjerg Municipality; Denmark
- Coordinates: 55°32′9.8″N 8°26′25.31″E
- Elevation: 20.6 metres (68 ft)
- Owner: Banedanmark
- Line: Esbjerg-Struer railway line
- Platforms: 2
- Tracks: 2
- Train operators: GoCollective

Construction
- Architect: Niels Peder Christian Holsøe

History
- Opened: 3 October 1874

Services
Preceding station	GoCollective	Following station
Gjesing towards Esbjerg	Esbjerg–Skjern Regional train	Varde Kaserne towards Skjern
Gjesing towards Esbjerg	Esbjerg–Nørre Nebel Local train	Varde Kaserne towards Nørre Nebel
Location

Guldager station is a railway station serving the railway town of Guldager Stationsby in West Jutland, Denmark.

Guldager station is located on the Esbjerg–Struer railway line from Esbjerg to Struer. The station opened in 1874. It offers regional rail services to Esbjerg, Varde, Skjern, and Aarhus, as well as local train services to Oksbøl and Nørre Nebel, all operated by the private public transport company GoCollective.

== History ==
The station opened on 3 October 1874 as the section from Esbjerg to Varde of the new Esbjerg–Struer railway line opened.

== Architecture ==
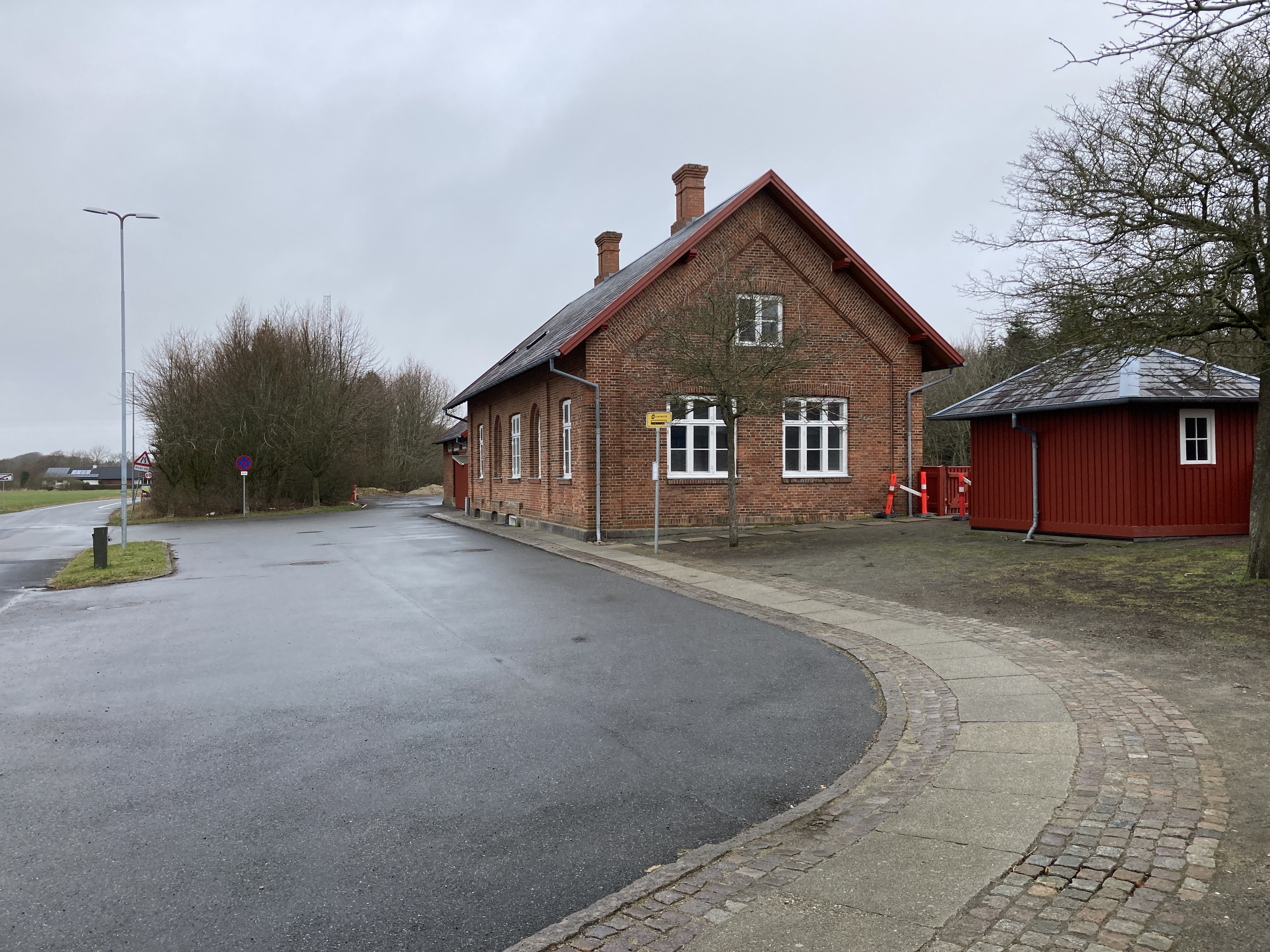
The station building in 2023.

Like the other stations on the Esbjerg–Struer railway line, the still existing station building from 1874 was built to designs by the Danish architect Niels Peder Christian Holsøe (1826–1895), known for the numerous railway stations he designed across Denmark in his capacity of head architect of the Danish State Railways.

== Services ==
The station offers direct regional rail services to Esbjerg, Varde, Skjern, Herning and Aarhus, as well as local train services to Oksbøl and Nørre Nebel, all operated by the private public transport company GoCollective.

== See also ==
- List of railway stations in Denmark
- Rail transport in Denmark
