= Spangsbjerg railway halt =

Railway halt in West Jutland, Denmark

Spangsbjerg
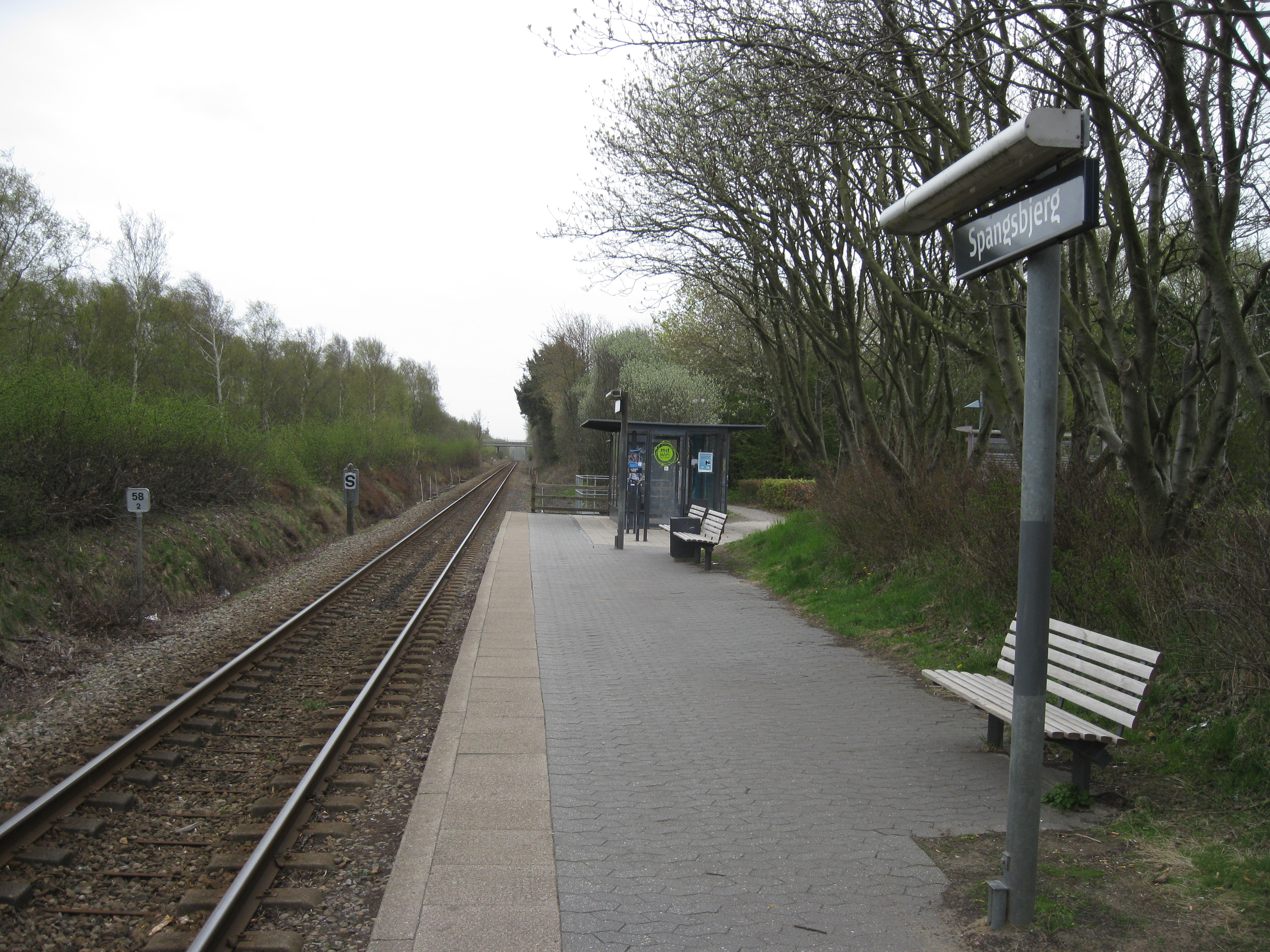
- Spangsbjerg railway halt in 2013

General information
- Location: Spangsbjerg Møllevej 65; 6715 Esbjerg N Esbjerg Municipality; Denmark
- Coordinates: 55°29′33″N 8°27′39″E
- Elevation: 15.5 metres (51 ft)
- Owner: Banedanmark
- Line: Esbjerg–Struer railway line
- Platforms: 1
- Tracks: 1
- Train operators: GoCollective

History
- Opened: 1985

Services
Preceding station	GoCollective	Following station
Esbjerg Terminus	Esbjerg–Skjern Regional train	Gjesing towards Skjern
Esbjerg Terminus	Esbjerg–Nørre Nebel Local train	Gjesing towards Nørre Nebel
Location

Spangsbjerg railway halt is a railway halt serving the district of Spangsbjerg in the northern part of the city of Esbjerg, Denmark.

Spangsbjerg railway halt is located on the Esbjerg–Struer railway line from Esbjerg to Struer. The railway halt opened in 1985. It offers regional rail services to Esbjerg, Varde, Skjern, and Aarhus, as well as local train services to Oksbøl and Nørre Nebel, all operated by GoCollective.

== Services ==
The station offers direct regional rail services to Esbjerg, Varde, Skjern, Herning and Aarhus, as well as local train services to Oksbøl and Nørre Nebel, all operated by the private public transport operating company GoCollective.

== See also ==
- List of railway stations in Denmark
- Rail transport in Denmark
