= Varde Kaserne railway halt =

Railway halt in West Jutland, Denmark

Varde Kaserne
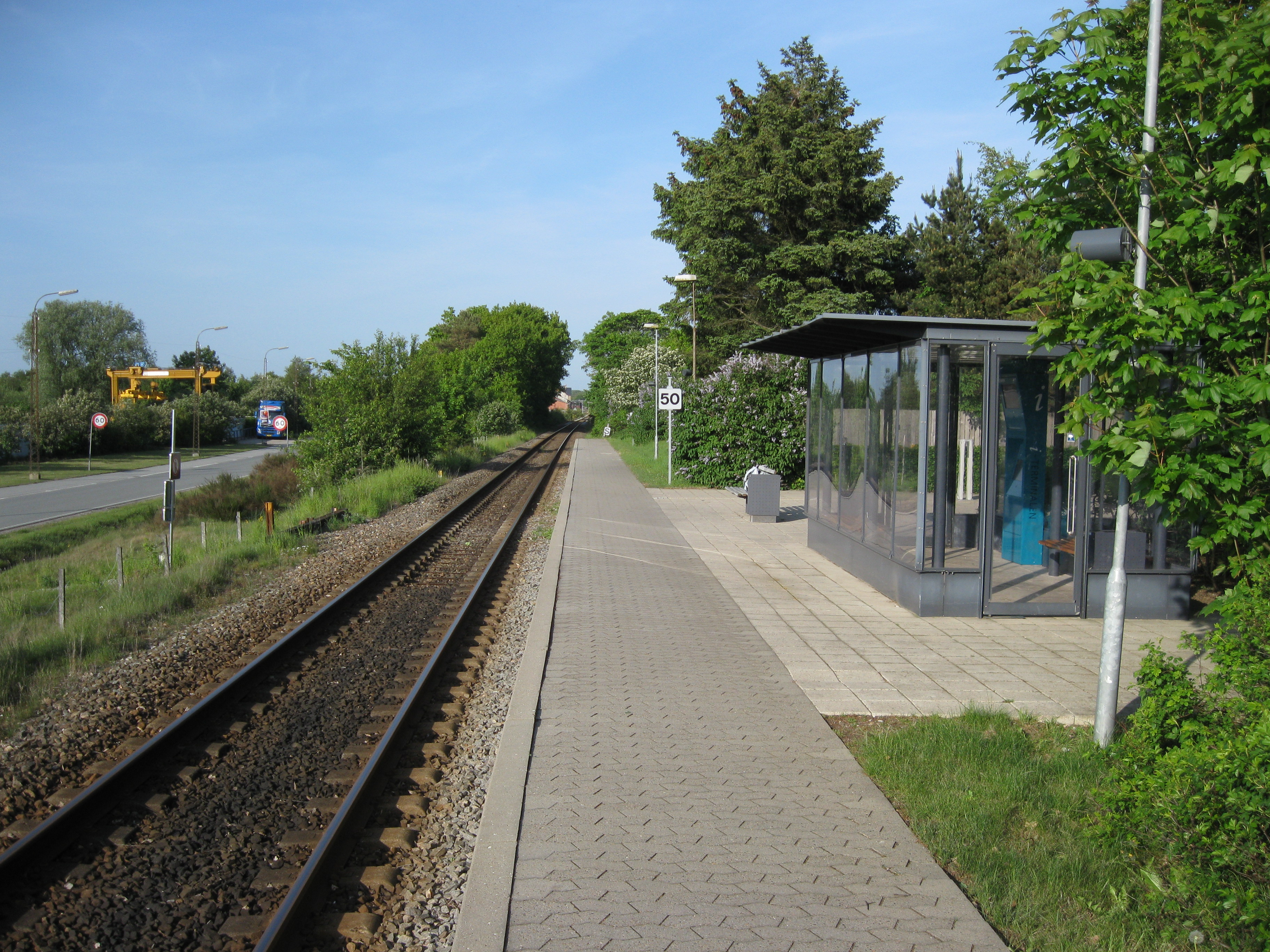
- Varde Kaserne railway halt in 2011

General information
- Location: Hjertingvej 66A; 6800 Varde; Varde Municipality; Denmark
- Coordinates: 55°36′43.5″N 8°28′20″E
- Elevation: 7.7 metres (25 ft)
- Owner: Banedanmark
- Line: Esbjerg-Struer railway line
- Platforms: 1
- Tracks: 1
- Train operators: GoCollective

Services
Preceding station	GoCollective	Following station
Guldager towards Esbjerg	Esbjerg–Skjern Regional train	Varde towards Skjern
Guldager towards Esbjerg	Esbjerg–Nørre Nebel Local train	Varde towards Nørre Nebel
Location

Varde Kaserne railway halt (Danish: Varde Kaserne Trinbræt) is a railway halt serving the southwestern part of the town of Varde in West Jutland, Denmark. The halt is located c. 300 m (980 ft) from the army barracks Varde Kaserne.

Varde Kaserne railway halt is located on the Esbjerg–Struer railway line from Esbjerg to Struer. The railway halt opened in 1984. It offers regional rail services to Aarhus, Esbjerg, Herning and Skjern, operated by the railway company GoCollective.

== Services ==
The station offers direct regional rail services to Esbjerg, Skjern, Herning and Aarhus, as well as local train services to Oksbøl and Nørre Nebel, all operated by the railway company GoCollective.

== See also ==
- List of railway stations in Denmark
- Rail transport in Denmark
