= Lunde railway station, Denmark =

Railway station in West Jutland, Denmark

Lunde
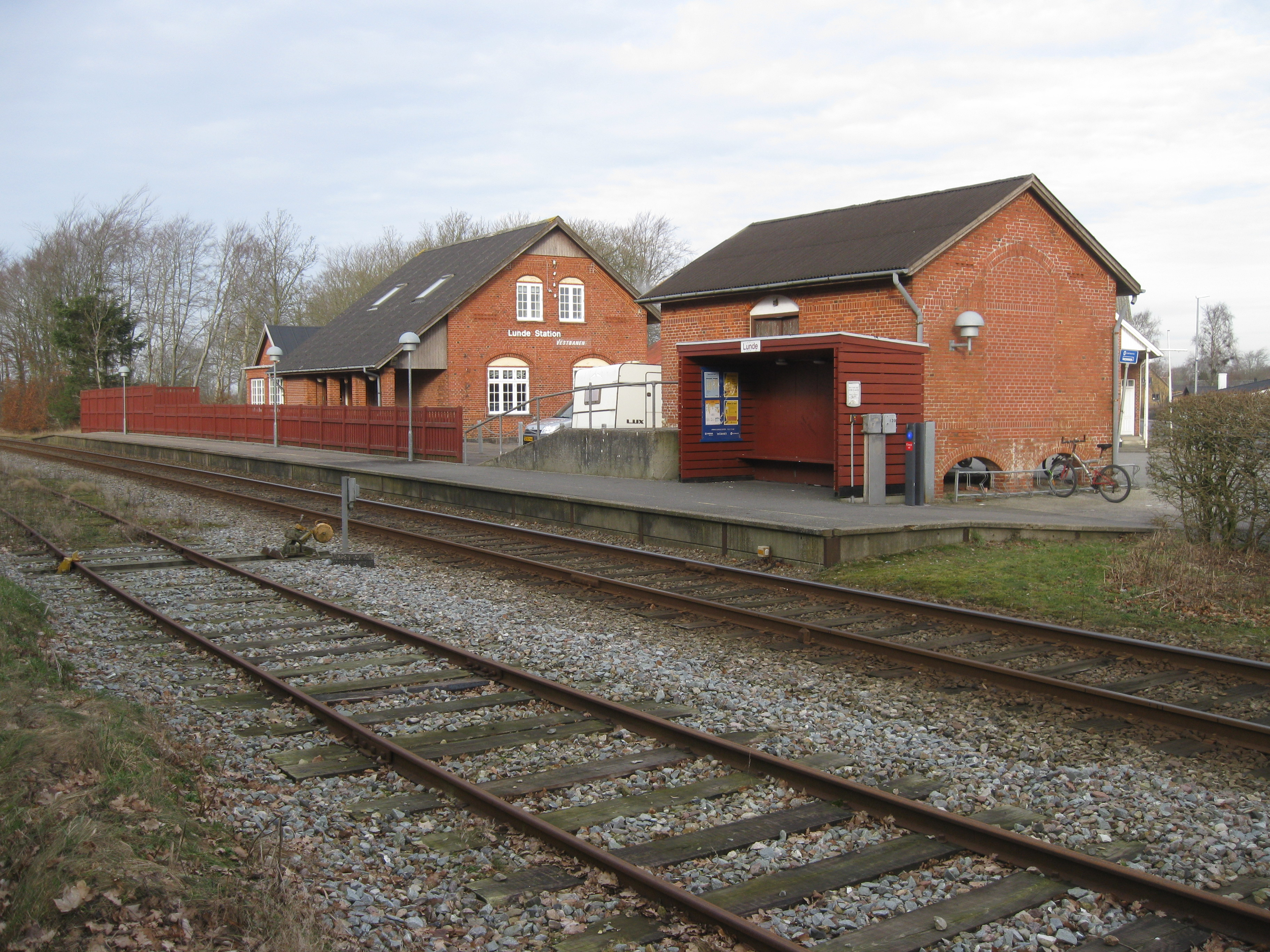
- Lunde station in 2017

General information
- Location: Skolegade 1; 6830 Nørre Nebel; Varde Municipality; Denmark
- Coordinates: 55°45′22.21″N 8°21′50.44″E
- Elevation: 22.7 metres (74 ft)
- Owner: Vestbanen A/S
- Line: Varde–Nørre Nebel
- Platforms: 1
- Tracks: 1
- Train operators: GoCollective

Construction
- Architect: Heinrich Wenck

History
- Opened: 15 March 1903

Services
Preceding station	GoCollective	Following station
Løftgård towards Esbjerg	Esbjerg–Nørre Nebel Local train	Nørre Nebel Terminus
Location

Lunde station is a railway station serving the village of Lunde in West Jutland, Denmark.

The station is located on the Varde–Nørre Nebel railway line from Varde to Nørre Nebel. The station opened on 15 March 1903 with the opening of the railway line. The train services are currently operated by GoCollective which run frequent regional train services from Nørre Nebel to Varde and Esbjerg with onward connections from there to the rest of Denmark.

== History ==
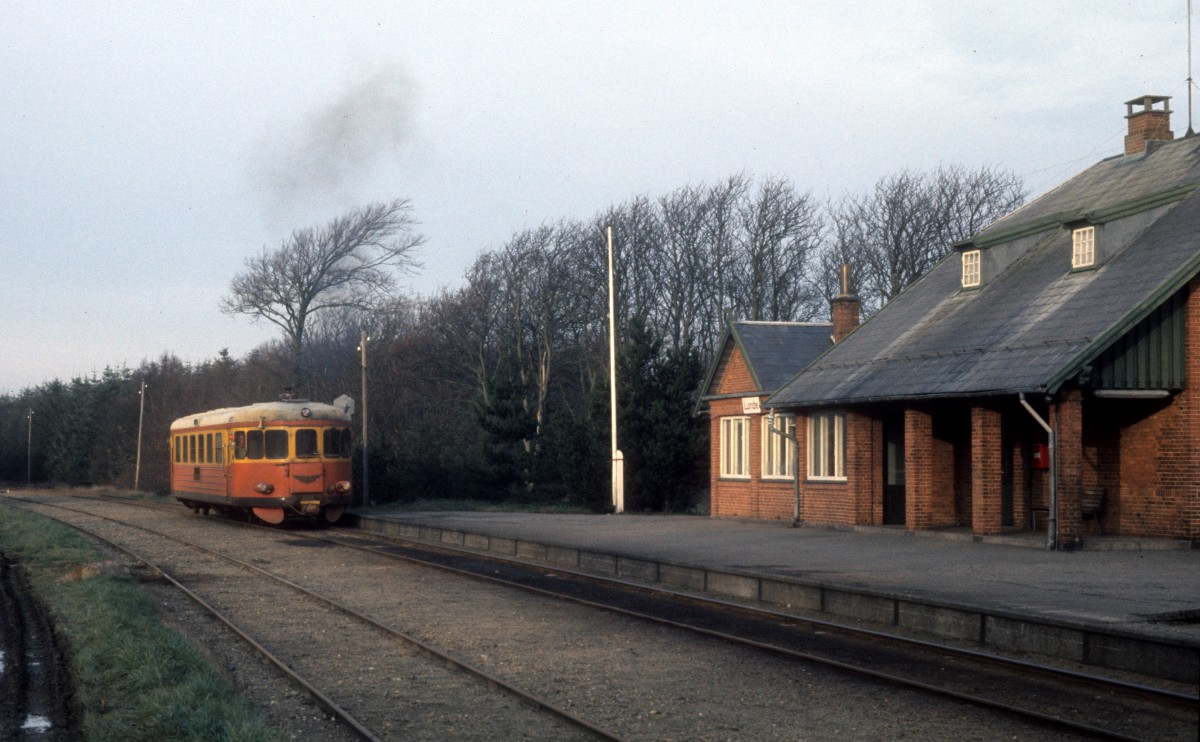
Railcar from Vestbanen at Lunde station in 1975.

The station opened on 15 March 1903 as an intermediate station on the new railway line from Varde to Nørre Nebel.

== Architecture ==
The original and still existing station building from 1903 was built to designs by the Danish architect Heinrich Wenck (1851–1936), known for the numerous railway stations he designed across Denmark in his capacity of head architect of the Danish State Railways.

== Operations ==
The train services are currently operated by the private public transport operating company GoCollective which run frequent local train services from Lunde station to Nørre Nebel, Varde and Esbjerg with onward connections from there to the rest of Denmark.

== See also ==
- List of railway stations in Denmark
- Rail transport in Denmark
