= Tarm railway station =

Railway station in West Jutland, Denmark

Tarm
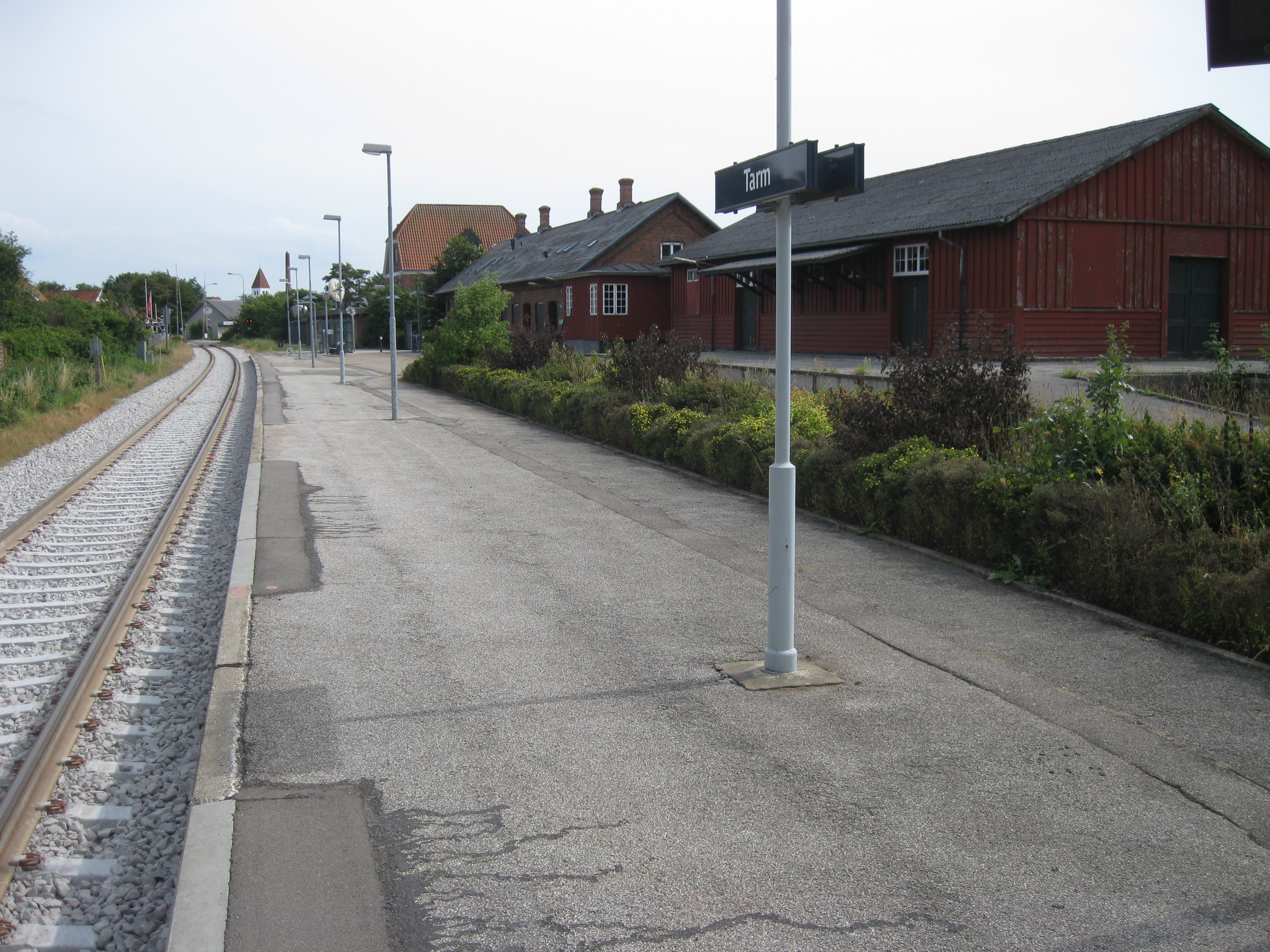
- Tarm station in 2013

General information
- Location: Stationsvej 4; 6880 Tarm; Ringkøbing-Skjern Municipality; Denmark
- Coordinates: 55°54′37″N 8°31′13″E
- Elevation: 5.6 metres (18 ft)
- Owner: DSB (station infrastructure); Banedanmark (rail infrastructure)
- Lines: Esbjerg-Struer railway line (since 1875); Varde–Nørre Nebel railway line (1913-1940)
- Platforms: 1
- Tracks: 1
- Train operators: GoCollective

Construction
- Architect: Niels Peder Christian Holsøe

History
- Opened: 8 August 1875

Services
Preceding station	GoCollective	Following station
Ølgod towards Esbjerg	Esbjerg–Skjern Regional train	Skjern Terminus
Location

Tarm railway station is a railway station serving the railway town of Tarm in West Jutland, Denmark. Tarm station is located on the Esbjerg–Struer railway line from Esbjerg to Struer. The station opened in 1875. It offers regional rail services to Aarhus, Esbjerg, Herning and Skjern, operated by the railway company GoCollective.

== History ==
The station opened on 8 August 1875 as the section from Varde to Ringkøbing of the new Esbjerg–Struer railway line opened.

On 4 November 1913, Tarm station was also the northern terminus of the Varde-Nørre Nebel railway line, when this railway line was prolonged from Nørre Nebel to Tarm. However, the Nørre Nebel–Tarm section was closed already on 1 September 1940.

The station has been unstaffed since 1970.

== Architecture ==
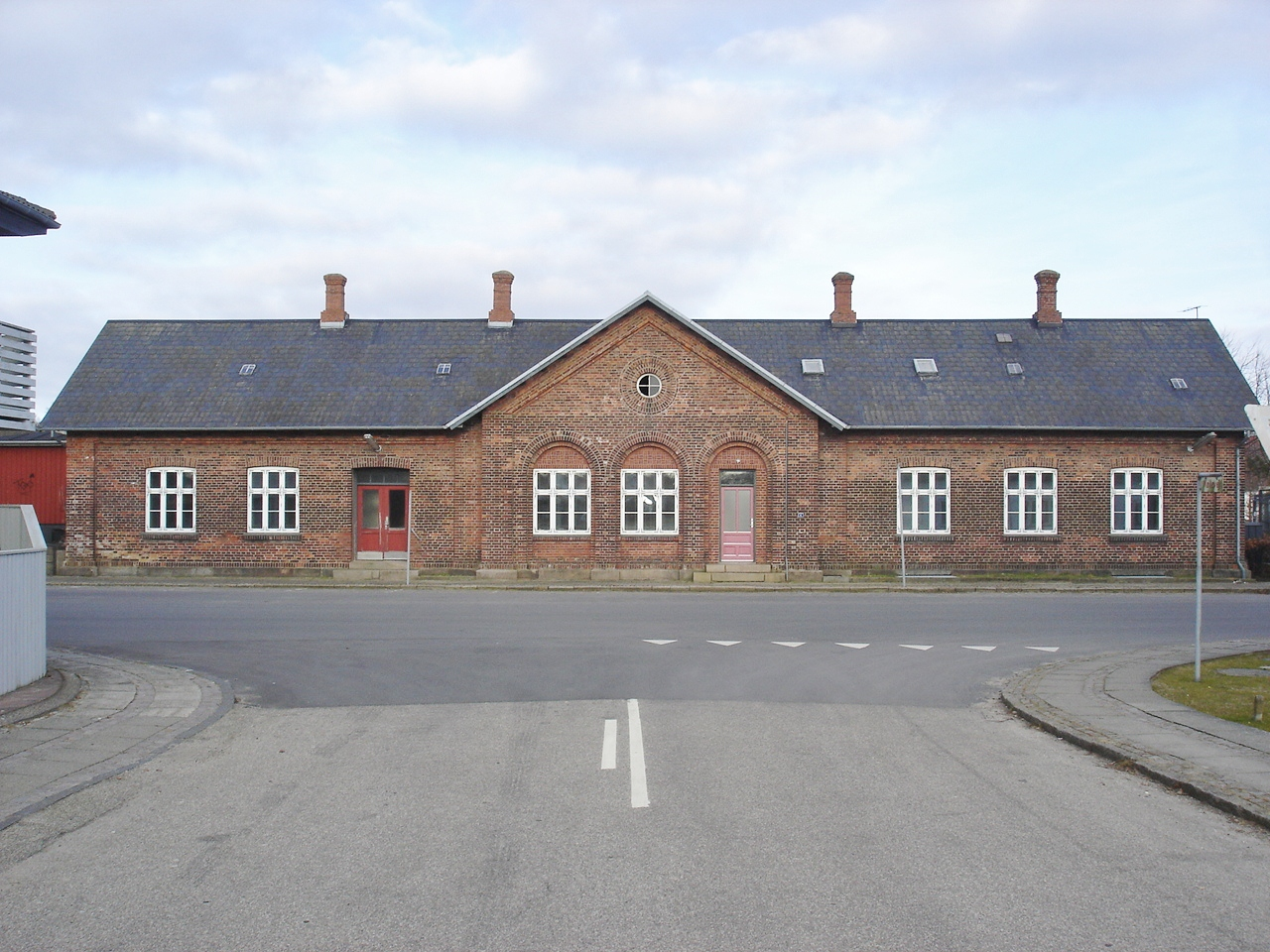
Street facade of the station building in 2013.

Like the other stations on the Esbjerg–Struer railway line, the still existing station building from 1875 was designed by the Danish architect Niels Peder Christian Holsøe (1826–1895), known for the numerous railway stations he designed across Denmark in his capacity of head architect of the Danish State Railways.

== Services ==
The station offers direct regional rail services to Esbjerg, Skjern, Herning and Aarhus, operated by the railway company GoCollective.

== See also ==
- List of railway stations in Denmark
- Rail transport in Denmark
