= Varde North railway halt =

Railway halt in West Jutland, Denmark

Varde Nord
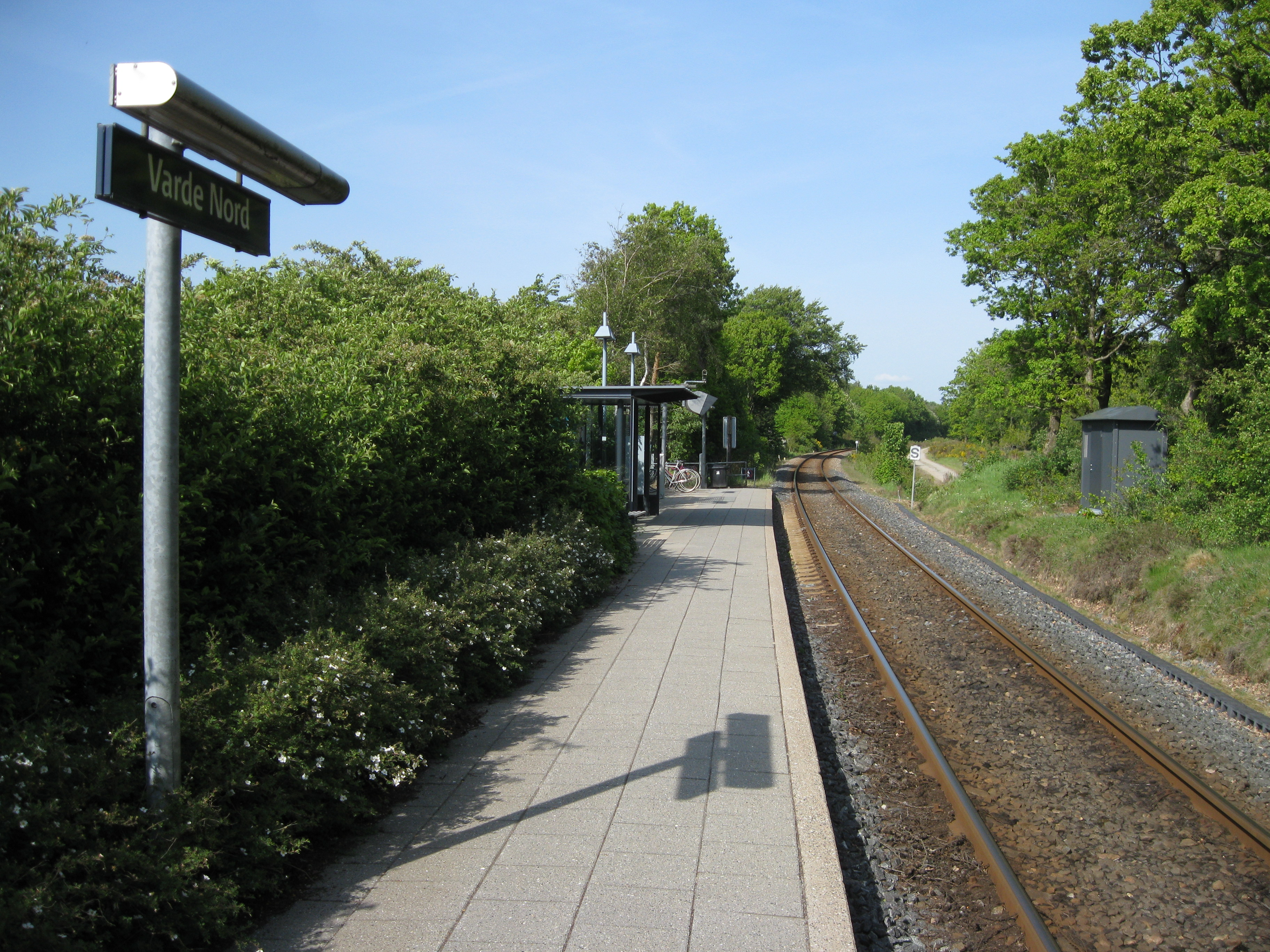
- Varde North railway halt in 2011

General information
- Location: Skrænten 15; 6800 Varde; Varde Municipality; Denmark
- Coordinates: 55°37′53″N 8°30′02″E
- Elevation: 11.3 metres (37 ft)
- Owner: Banedanmark
- Line: Esbjerg-Struer railway line
- Platforms: 1
- Tracks: 1
- Train operators: GoCollective

History
- Opened: 13 August 1984

Services
Preceding station	GoCollective	Following station
Varde towards Esbjerg	Esbjerg–Skjern Regional train	Sig towards Skjern
Location

Varde North railway halt (Danish: Varde Nord Trinbræt) is a railway halt serving the northeastern part of the town of Varde in West Jutland, Denmark. The halt is located c. 500 m (1,600 ft) from the preparatory high school Varde Gymnasium.

Varde North railway halt is located on the Esbjerg–Struer railway line from Esbjerg to Struer. The railway halt opened in 1984. It offers regional rail services to Aarhus, Esbjerg, Herning and Skjern, operated by the railway company GoCollective.

== History ==
The railway halt opened in 1984 as a new stop on the Esbjerg–Struer railway line, which opened in 1875.

== Services ==
The station offers direct regional rail services to Esbjerg, Skjern, Herning and Aarhus, operated by the railway company GoCollective.

== See also ==
- List of railway stations in Denmark
- Rail transport in Denmark
