= Esbjerg Municipality =

Esbjerg Municipality Esbjerg Kommune (Danish)
- Municipality
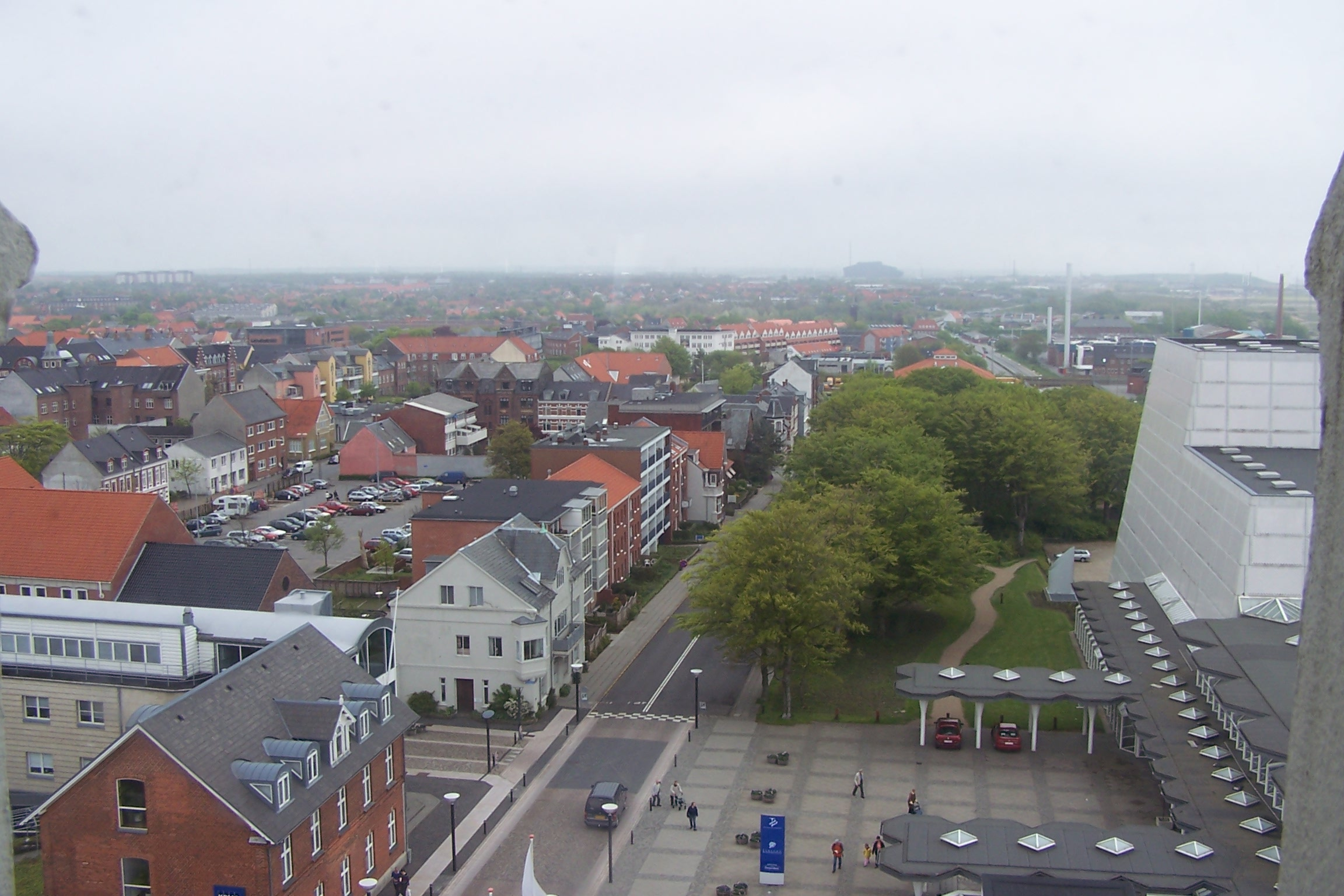

- Coat of arms

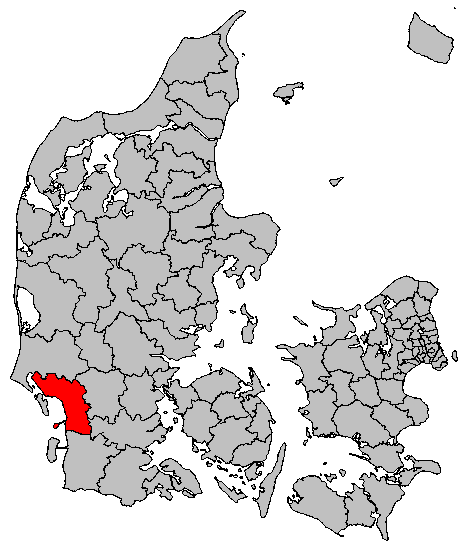
- Coordinates: 55°28′00″N 8°27′00″E
- Country: Denmark
- Region: Southern Denmark
- Seat: Esbjerg

Government
  - Mayor: Jesper Frost Rasmussen

Area
  - Total: 742.5 km^{2} (286.7 sq mi)

Population (1 January 2026)
  - Total: 114,947
  - Density: 154.8/km^{2} (401.0/sq mi)
- Time zone: UTC1 (CET)
  - Summer (DST): UTC2 (CEST)
- Website: www.esbjerg.dk

Esbjerg Municipality (Danish: Esbjerg Kommune, Danish pronunciation: [ˈesˌpjɛɐ̯ˀ]) is a kommune in the Region of Southern Denmark on the west coast of the Jutland peninsula in southwest Denmark. Its mayor is Jesper Frost Rasmussen, from the Venstre (Center-Right Party) political party. By 1 January 2007, the old Esbjerg municipality was, as the result of Kommunalreformen ("The Municipal Reform" of 2007), merged with the former Bramming and Ribe and a small part of Helle municipalities to form the new Esbjerg municipality. This municipality has an area of 741 km^{2} (286 sq. miles) and a total population of 114,947 (2026).

== Overview ==
The main town and the site of its municipal council is the city of Esbjerg, the fifth largest city in Denmark.

Neighboring municipalities with land connection are Tønder to the south, Haderslev to the southeast, Vejen to the east, and Varde to the north. The neighboring municipality to the west is Fanø, an island municipality located in Fanø Bay (Fanø Bugt). Beyond the island of Fanø and Fanø Bay is the North Sea.

== Locations ==
Largest cities and villages in Esbjerg Municipality
Name	Population (2024)
Esbjerg	71,505
Ribe	8,295
Bramming	7,267
Tjæreborg	2,876
Gørding	1,758
Tarp	1,663
Andrup	1,460
Egebæk	1,107
Gredstedbro	1,063
Guldager	973

== Infrastructure ==
=== Rail ===
Esbjerg Municipality has 13 railway stations, which forms a dense network, compared to other municipalities in Denmark, despite its many rural towns.

List of stations in Esbjerg Municipality
	Station	Departing Passengers	Departing trains	Largest destination
1	Esbjerg	753,060	32,736	Bramming
2	Bramming	252,685	45,508	Esbjerg
3	Ribe	127,894	15,135	Esbjerg
4	Spangsbjerg	50,724	19,971	Varde
5	Jerne	45,130	19,973	
6	Gjesing	44,818	19,969	Varde
7	Hviding	41,063	10,561	Esbjerg
8	Tjæreborg	30,790	19,969	Esbjerg
9	Ribe Nørremark	29,911	19,977	Esbjerg
10	Gredstedbro	23,869	19,977	Ribe
11	Gørding	21,731	14,336	Esbjerg
12	Guldager	9,829	19,969	Esbjerg
13	Sejstrup	8,861	19,977	Esbjerg

== Politics ==
Esbjerg's municipal council consists of 31 members, elected every four years. The municipal council has seven political committees.

=== Municipal council ===
Below are the municipal councils elected since the Municipal Reform of 2007.

Election	Party									Total seats	Turnout	Elected mayor
Election	A	B	C	D	E	F	O	V	Ø	Total seats	Turnout	Elected mayor
2005	10	1	1			3	1	15		31	65.8%	Johnny Søtrup (V)
2009	10		1			5	2	13		31	61.3%	Johnny Søtrup (V)
2013	9		1			2	2	15	2	31	68.9%	Johnny Søtrup (V)
2017	11	1	1		1	2	3	11	1	31	69.1%	Jesper Frost Rasmussen (V)
2021	9	1	3	1		3	1	13		31	64.2%	Jesper Frost Rasmussen (V)
Data from Kmdvalg.dk 2005, 2009, 2013, 2017 and 2021

== Twin towns – sister cities ==
Esbjerg is twinned with:

- Eskilstuna, Sweden
- Fjarðabyggð, Iceland
- Jyväskylä, Finland
- Qeqqata, Greenland
- Stavanger, Norway
- Suzhou, China
- Szczecin, Poland
- Tórshavn, Faroe Islands
