= Vestbanen =

Vestbanen, literally meaning "the West Line", may refer to:

- Copenhagen–Fredericia/Taulov Line, a mainline railway in Denmark
- Oslo West Station, a former railway station in Oslo, Norway
- Vestbanen (company), a railway company and a local railway line in Denmark
- Vestbanen Line, a tram line in Oslo, Norway
- Vestbanen, Norway, a neighborhood of Oslo, Norway
- Vestbanen (S-tog), a rapid transit line in Greater Copenhagen, Denmark
