= Tarp, Denmark =

Tarp
- Town
- Location in Region of Southern Denmark Tarp (Denmark)
- Coordinates: 55°31′32″N 8°27′51″E
- Country: Denmark
- Region: Southern Denmark
- Municipality: Esbjerg Municipality

Area
  - Urban: 1.2 km^{2} (0.46 sq mi)

Population (2026)
  - Urban: 1,683
  - Urban density: 1,400/km^{2} (3,600/sq mi)
- Time zone: UTC+1 (CET)
  - Summer (DST): UTC+2 (CEST)
- Postal code: DK-6715 Esbjerg N

Tarp is a town and northern suburb of Esbjerg, with a population of 1,683 (1 January 2026), in Esbjerg Municipality, Region of Southern Denmark in Denmark.

== Tarp-Bunkermuseum ==
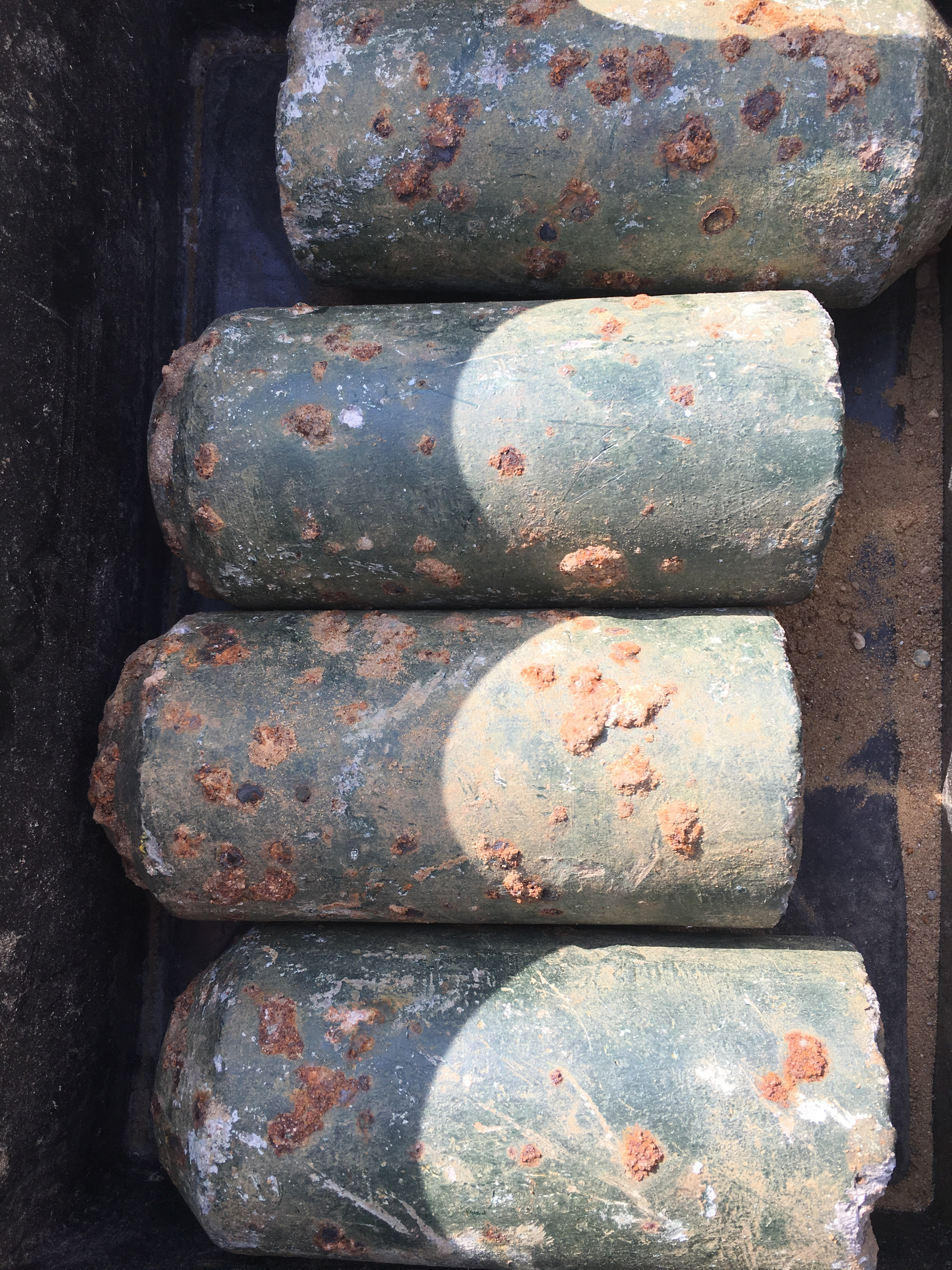
Stock mines from Esbjerg Airfield

Tarp-Bunkermuseum, located east of the town, is a museum established in a German bunker. The bunker was part of Esbjerg Flyveplads (Esbjerg Airfield) which was used by German troops. The museum tells the story of the airfield and the area during the Second World War.

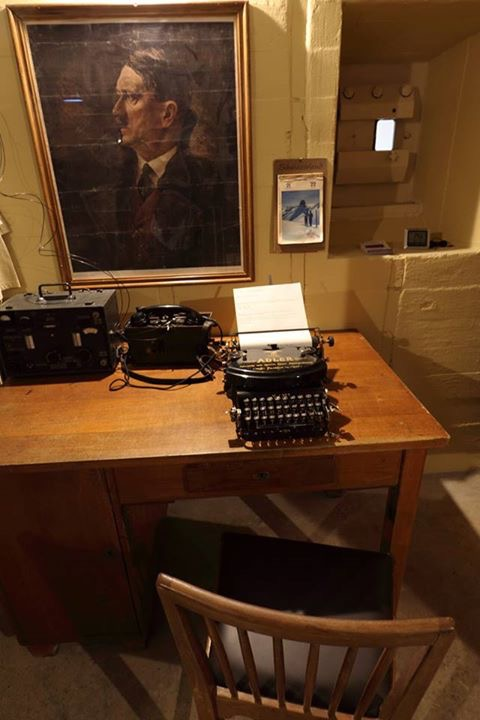
Tarp Bunkermuseum - table

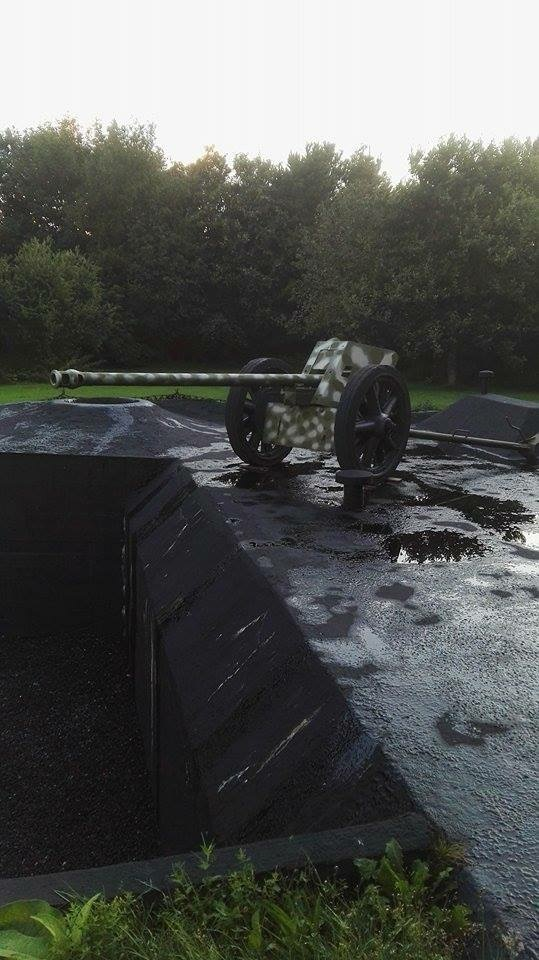
Tarp Bunkermuseum - canon

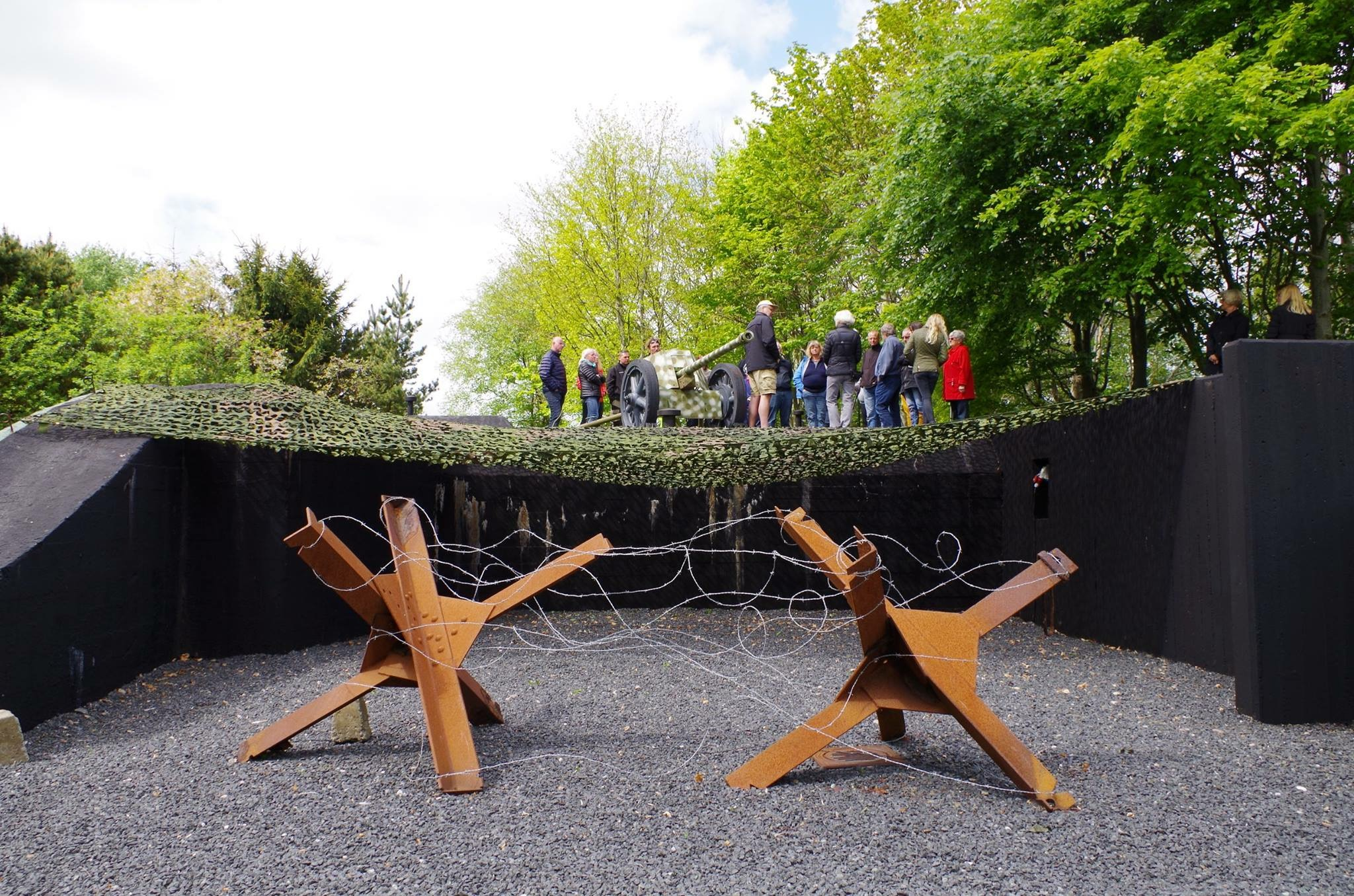
Tarp Bunkermuseum - Cheval de frise

== Tarp Bryggeri ==
Tarp Bryggeri, a small brewery specialised in wine and mead brewing, is located in the town.
