= Egebæk =

- Town
- Location in Denmark Egebæk (Region of Southern Denmark)
- Coordinates: 55°16′46″N 8°43′32″E
- Country: Denmark
- Region: Southern Denmark
- Municipality: Esbjerg Municipality

Area
  - Urban: 1.2 km^{2} (0.46 sq mi)

Population (2026)
  - Urban: 1,129
  - Urban density: 940/km^{2} (2,400/sq mi)
- Time zone: UTC+1 (CET)
  - Summer (DST): UTC+2 (CEST)
- Postal Code: DK-6760 Ribe

Egebæk or Egebæk-Hviding is a small town, with a population of 1,129 (1 January 2026), in Esbjerg Municipality, Region of Southern Denmark in Denmark. It is located 6 km south of Ribe near the Danish part of The Wadden Sea.

The central part of the town was formerly called Vedsted. It was a border town divided between Denmark and Germany from 1864 until 1920 with a barrier blocking the main street. Vedsted was located between the villages of Egebæk to the north in Denmark and Hviding to the south in Germany. The town later changed its name when it merged with the two villages.
