= Oksbøl Refugee Camp =

Camp for Germans in Denmark after WWII

Coordinates: 55°38′07″N 8°16′25″E

The Oksbøl Refugee Camp was the largest camp for German refugees in Denmark after World War II.

== Background ==
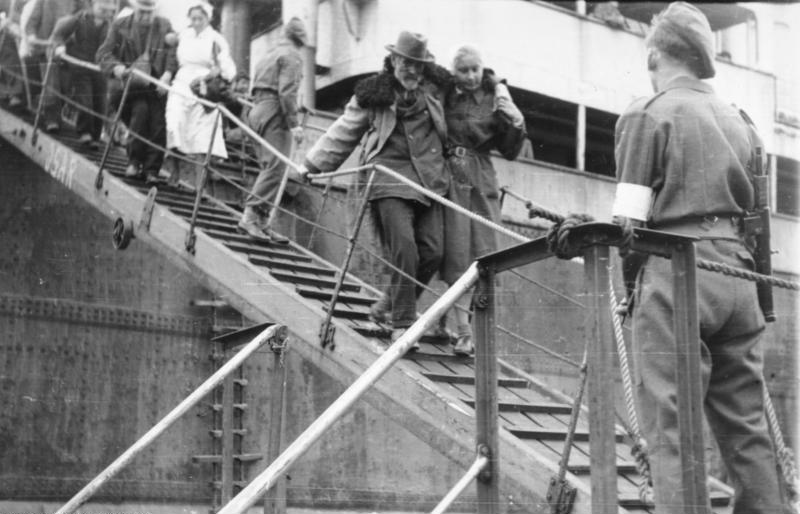
Refugees arriving

In early 1945 the Red Army started the East Prussian and East Pomeranian Offensives, soon interrupting the overland route to the western areas of Germany. Up to 900,000 civilians, primarily from East Prussia, Farther Pomerania, and the Baltic states and 350,000 German soldiers were evacuated throughout the Operation Hannibal across the Baltic Sea. About 250,000 civilians were shipped to German-occupied Denmark between 11 February and 5 May 1945. The German refugee population in Denmark, most of them women, elderly and children, a third under the age of fifteen, amounted to 5% of the total Danish population. In 1945 alone more than 13,000 refugees, among them 7,000 children under the age of five, died in Denmark. According to the Danish historian Kirsten Lylloff, the Danish Association of Doctors and the Danish Red Cross decided to grant medical care only to those refugees whose diseases would threaten the Danish population and most children died of "perfectly curable" diseases.

The refugees were provisionally housed in schools, village halls and the like in 1,100 sites all over the country and later gathered in larger camps (465 in October 1945), of which Oksbøl was the largest.

== The Camp ==
Oksbøl is a town 20 km northwest of Esbjerg at the Danish North Sea coast. The site of the camp was initially used as a military training area by the Danish army and, after the German occupation of Denmark, by the German Wehrmacht. It was situated west of Oksbøl in the forest "Aal Plantage".

The refugee camp was established in February 1945 and housed 10,500 people in May 1945. Later on up to 37,000 refugees were placed here. The existing barracks and horse stables were used and a town of hutments was built, fenced with barbed wire and guarded by Danish troops. Contact with the Danish population outside of the camp was rare and the refugees were forbidden to learn Danish. At that time Oksbøl was the sixth largest town of Denmark.

Next to a Danish commander, the camp had its own elected mayor and town council. The administration was organized by the inmates and a court, a cinema, a number of churches, hospitals and schools existed. The theater was conducted by Walter Warndorf, the former director of the Danziger Staatstheater, and his wife Eva Just. A spinning mill employed 150 refugees every day and there were all kinds of craft enterprises. The inmates were however not allowed to work outside of the camp. About 300 refugees formed a police force to maintain order in the camp.

Almost 900 children were born in the camp and more than 12,000 of the inhabitants were children below the age of fourteen.

The camp was subsequently dissolved and the last refugee transport left to Germany on 15 December 1948. The area was again used as a military camp of the Danish army until 1983. The former hospital is today used as a Youth hostel, only a few remains of the camp still exist.

== Oksbøl War Cemetery ==
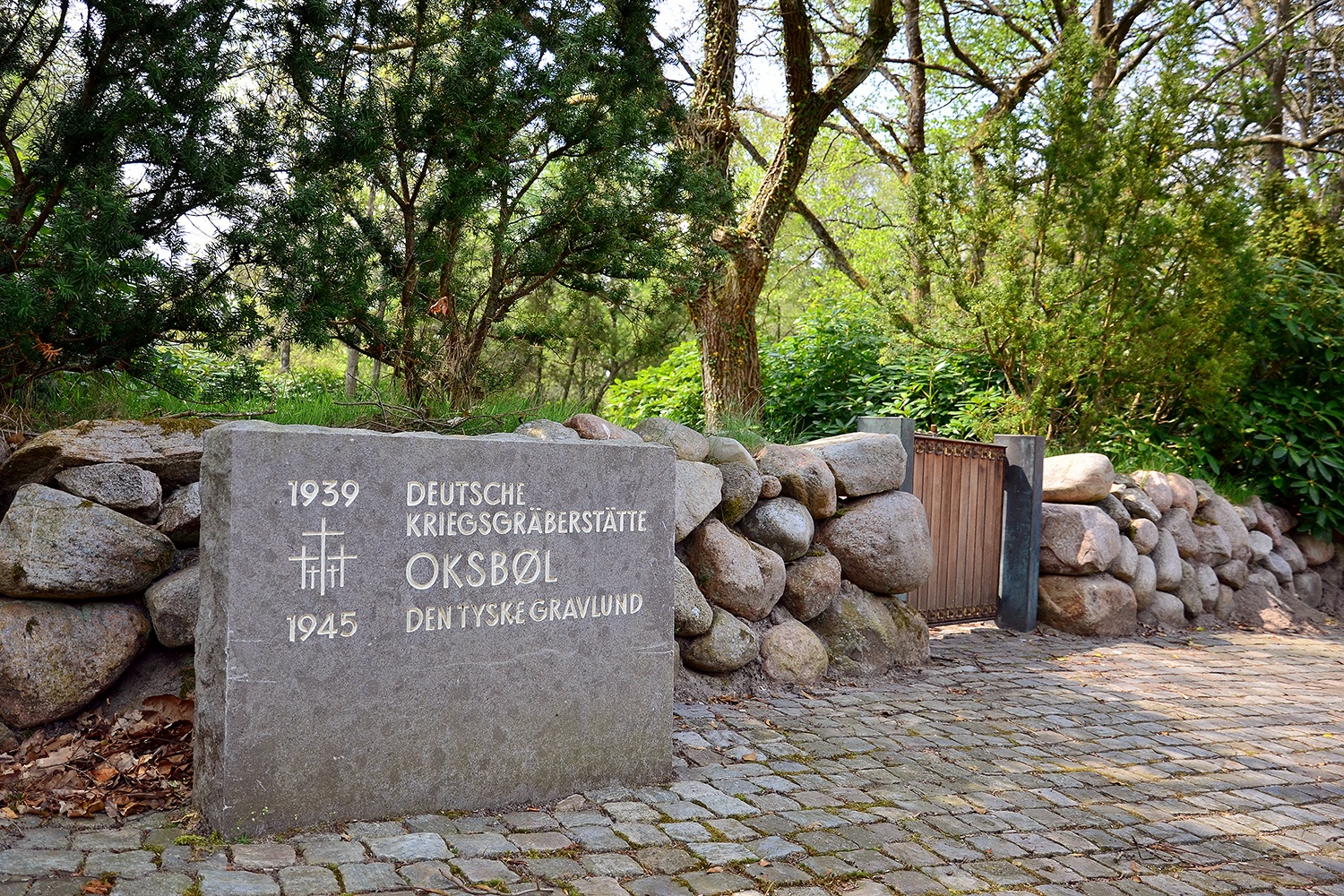
Oksbøl War Cemetery

About 1,400 people, many of them young children, died in custody, whereof 1,247 were buried at the camp's cemetery. Further burials of refugees who died at other camps were made later and today 1,675 refugees and 121 German soldiers are buried at the Oksbøl war cemetery.
