= Varde–Nørre Nebel railway line =

Railway line in West Jutland, Denmark

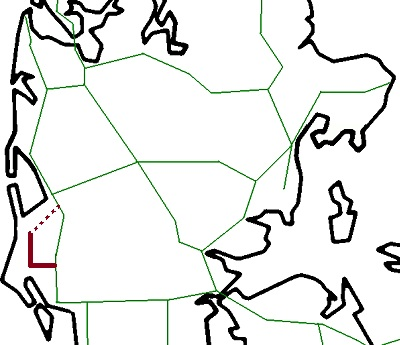

Overview
- Other name(s): Vestbanen; Nebelbanen
- Native name: Varde-Nørre Nebel Jernbane
- Owner: Vestbanen
- Termini: Varde 55.616100°N 8.484255°E; Nørre Nebel 55.777381°N 8.290450°E
- Stations: 17

Service
- Type: Railway
- System: Danish railways
- Operator: Arriva
- Rolling stock: Alstom Coradia LINT

History
- Opened: 15 March 1903

Technical
- Line length: 37.6 km (23.4 mi)
- Number of tracks: 1
- Character: Local railway
- Track gauge: 1,435 mm (4 ft 8 1/2 in)
- Electrification: No
- Operating speed: 75 km/h (47 mph)
Route map
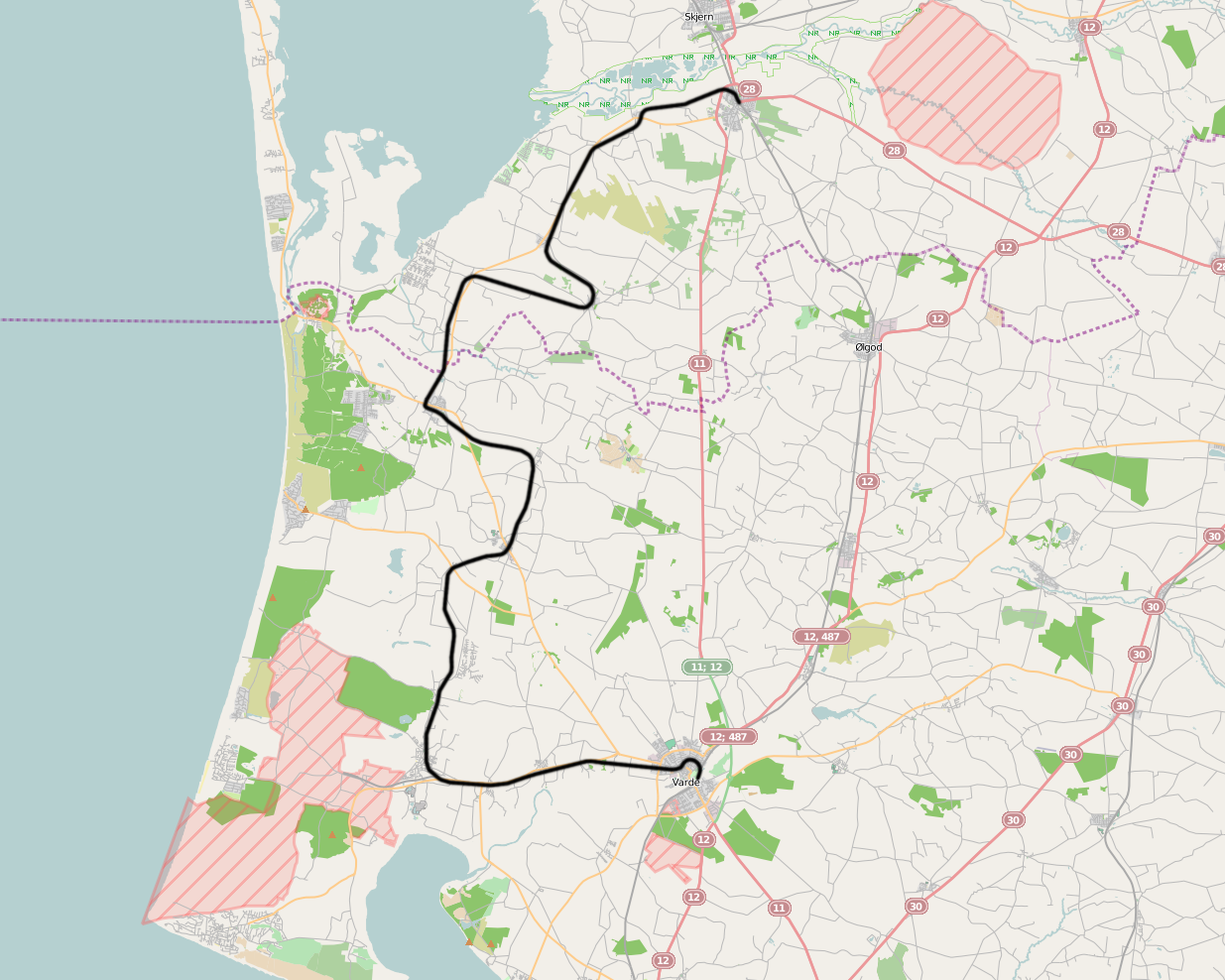

The Varde–Nørre Nebel railway line (Danish: Varde-Nørre Nebel Jernbane), also called the West Line (Danish: Vestbanen) and the Nebel Line (Danish: Nebelbanen), colloquially referred to as Nebelgrisen (literally meaning the Nebel pig), is a 37.6 kilometres (23.4 mi) long local railway line in West Jutland, Denmark. It was opened for traffic in 1903. It has standard gauge and is not electrified.

Varde Vest station was originally the terminus for the trains, but today almost all the trains connect with the Esbjerg–Varde railway line and continue to stations like Esbjerg, Ribe, Tønder and Niebüll.

== History ==
The railway line opened on 15 March 1903 to connect the market town of Varde with Nørre Nebel by way of Oksbøl. In 1913, the railway line was extended from Nørre Nebel to the railway town of Tarm on the Esbjerg–Struer railway line, but this section was closed again in 1940.

During The second world war, the rail line saw a huge increase in traffic, mainly because of the German expansion of Oksbøllejren and Nymindegablejren as part of the Atlantic wall.

== The Vestbanen railway company ==

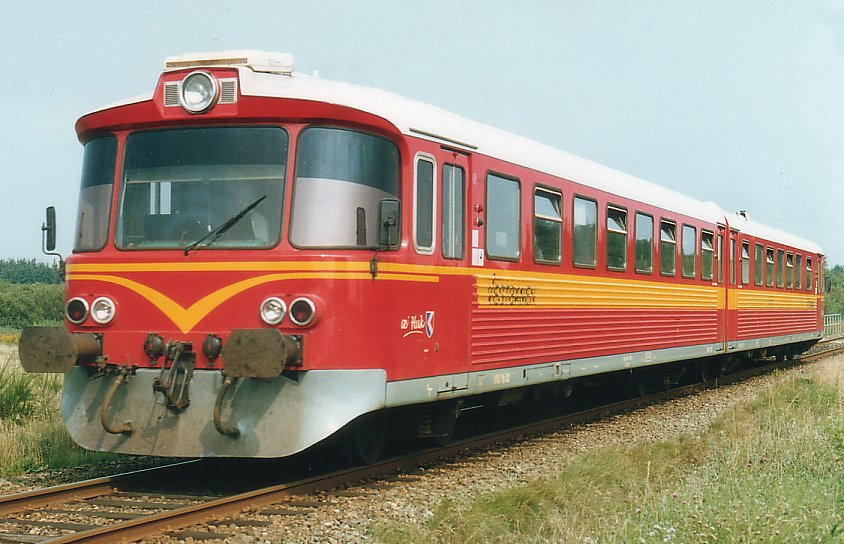
Train owned by the company, going along the railway

The railway line is owned and was previously operated by the railway company Vestbanen A/S, previously known as Varde-Nørre Nebel Jernbane (VNJ). Formerly owned by Ribe County (until the Danish Municipal Reform of 2007), the company leased its trains and infrastructure to Arriva, which has operates Vestbanen's railway line since 2002. Established in 1903, the company was originally headquartered in Varde, but is now administered from the county's offices in Ribe. The company is wholly owned by the Region of Southern Denmark.

== Route ==
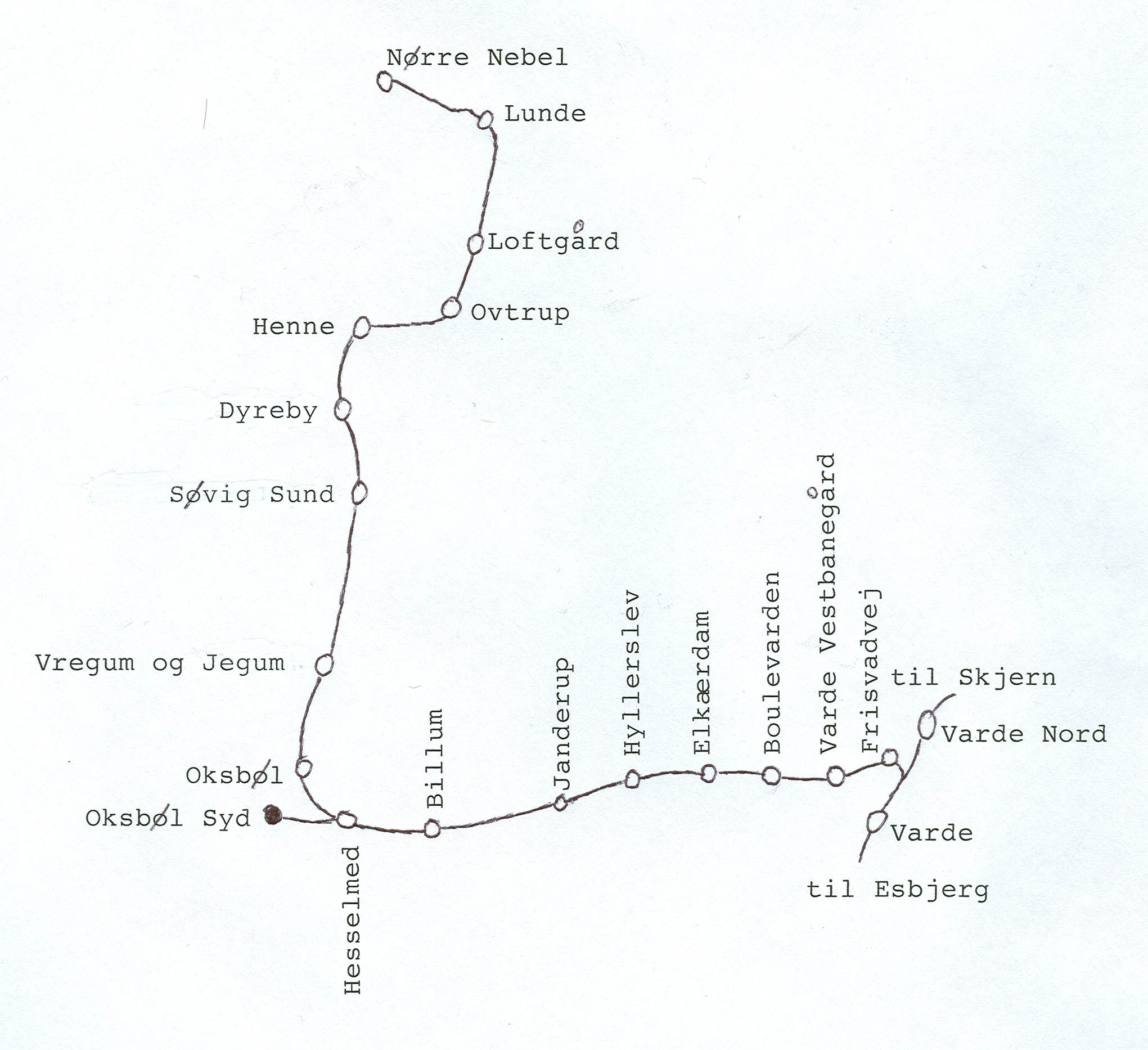
Route map of the Varde–Nørre Nebel railway line.

The Varde–Nørre Nebel railway line starts at Varde railway station where it branches from the Esbjerg–Struer railway line. After curving east and north of the town centre of Varde, it reaches Varde Vest on the northwestern edge of the historic town centre. From there it continues almost due west to the village of Oksbøl. From Oksbøl, the line continues north to its terminus at Nørre Nebel.

== Stations ==
List of stations on the current Vestbane from Varde to Nørre Nebel

Station	Opened	Total Boadings (2021)	Distance from Varde st. (km)	Notes
Varde	1874	104743	0,0	
Frisvadvej	1962	9868	1,5	Request Stop
Varde Vest	1903	40583	2,4	
Boulevarden	1987	2351	3,5	Request Stop
Hyllerslev	1903	143	7,4	Request Stop
Janderup	2002	5949	8,9	Request Stop
Billum	1903	4215	11,7	Request Stop
Oksbøl	1903	23199	15,1	
Baunhøj	1942	11407	16,4	Request Stop
Vrøgum	1903	7529	18,2	Request Stop
Jegum	1992	841	19,6	Request Stop
Dyreby	1945	289	23,6	Request Stop
Henne	1903	3491	25,0	Request Stop
Outrup	1903	28938	27,7	Request Stop
Løftgård	1945	865	29,1	Request Stop
Lunde	1903	8075	32,2	Request Stop
Nørre Nebel	1903	25344	37,3	

== See also ==
- Rail transport in Denmark
