= Oksbøl railway station =

Railway station in West Jutland, Denmark

Oksbøl
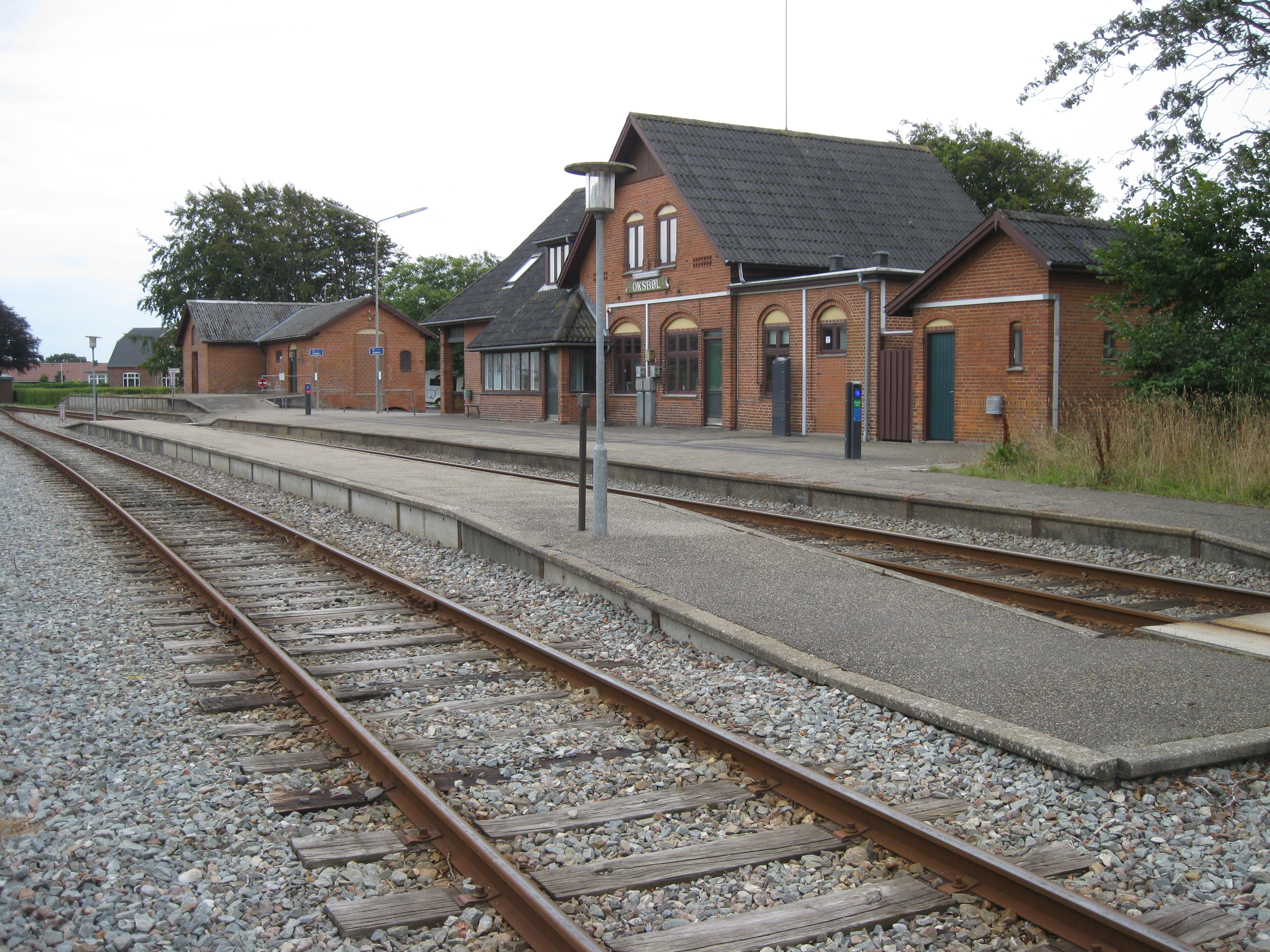
- Oksbøl station in 2014

General information
- Location: Østergade 17; 6840 Oksbøl; Varde Municipality; Denmark
- Coordinates: 55°37′33″N 8°17′1.5″E
- Elevation: 15.6 metres (51 ft)
- Owner: Vestbanen A/S
- Line: Varde–Nørre Nebel
- Platforms: 2
- Tracks: 2
- Train operators: GoCollective

Construction
- Architect: Heinrich Wenck

Other information
- Station code: Ox

History
- Opened: 15 March 1903
- Former names: Oxbøl

Services
Preceding station	GoCollective	Following station
Billum towards Esbjerg	Esbjerg–Nørre Nebel Local train	Baunhøj towards Nørre Nebel
Location

Oksbøl railway station is a railway station serving the railway town of Oksbøl in West Jutland, Denmark.

The station is located on the Varde–Nørre Nebel railway line from Varde to Nørre Nebel via Oksbøl. The station opened in 1903. The train services are currently operated by GoCollective which run frequent local train services from Oksbøl to Nørre Nebel, Varde and Esbjerg with onward connections from there to the rest of Denmark.

== History ==
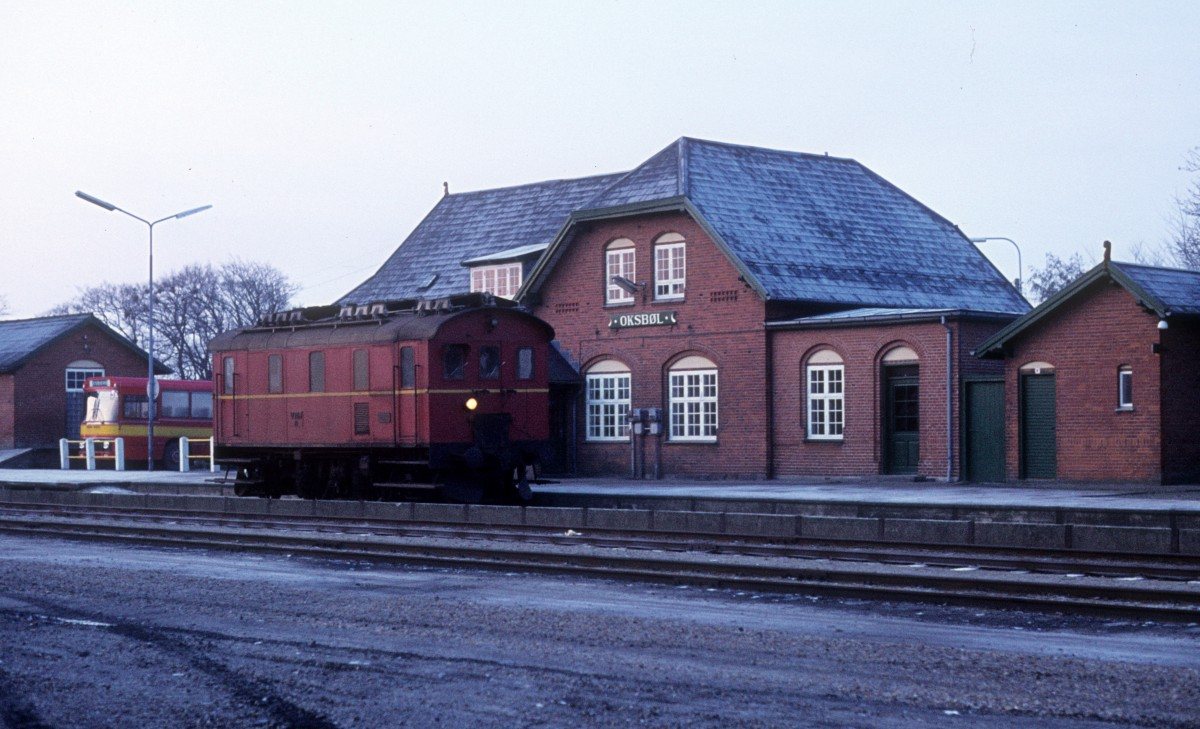
Engine from Vestbanen at Oksbøl station in 1975.

The station opened on 15 March 1903 as an intermediate station on the new railway line from Varde to Nørre Nebel.

== Architecture ==
The original and still existing station building from 1903 was built to designs by the Danish architect Heinrich Wenck (1851–1936), known for the numerous railway stations he designed across Denmark in his capacity of head architect of the Danish State Railways.

== Operations ==
=== Train services ===
The train services are currently operated by the private public transport operating company GoCollective which run frequent local train services from Oksbøl station to Nørre Nebel, Varde and Esbjerg with onward connections from there to the rest of Denmark.

== See also ==
- List of railway stations in Denmark
- Rail transport in Denmark
