= Varde railway station =

Railway station in West Jutland, Denmark

Varde
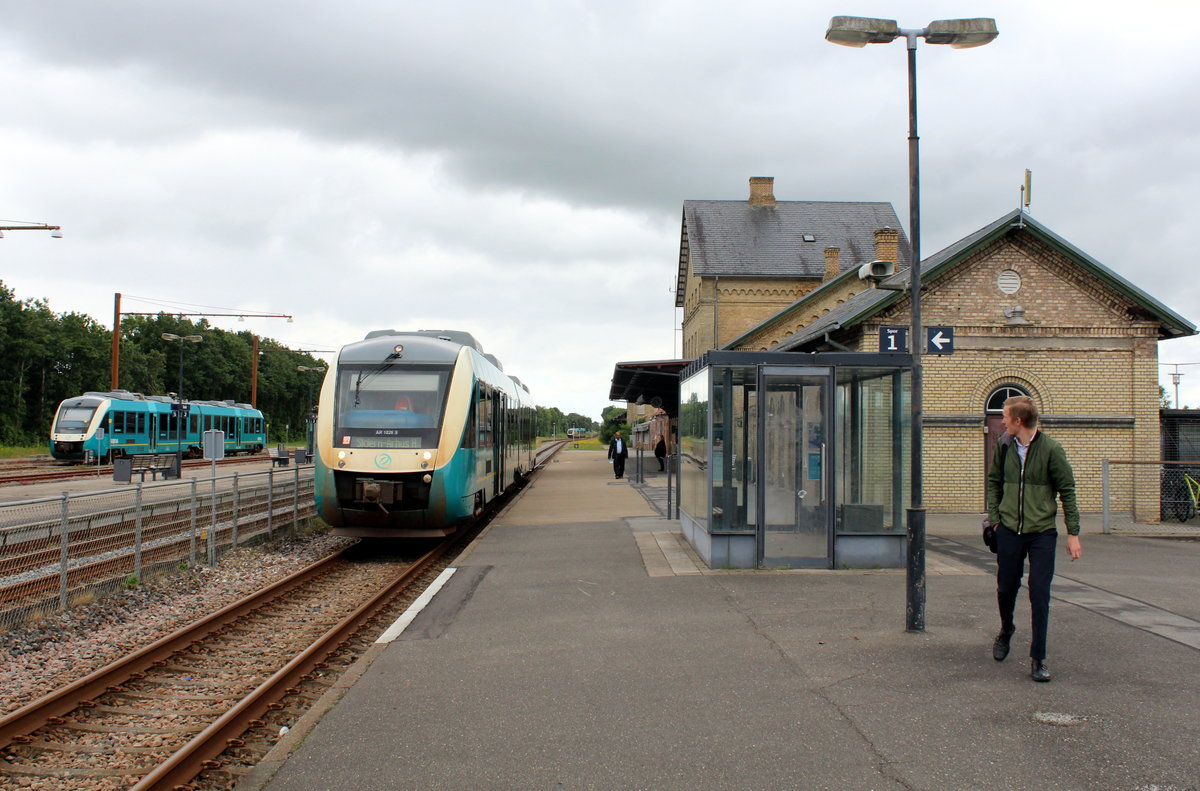
- Varde station in 2020

General information
- Location: Stationspladsen 3; 6800 Varde; Varde Municipality; Denmark
- Coordinates: 55°36′57″N 8°29′03″E
- Elevation: 5.1 metres (17 ft)
- Owner: DSB (station infrastructure); Banedanmark (rail infrastructure)
- Lines: Esbjerg–Struer; Varde–Nørre Nebel; Varde–Grindsted (closed 1972)
- Platforms: 4
- Tracks: 9
- Train operators: GoCollective

Construction
- Architect: Niels Peder Christian Holsøe

History
- Opened: 3 October 1874

Passengers
- 2022: 130,155 per year

Services
Preceding station	GoCollective	Following station
Varde Kaserne towards Esbjerg	Esbjerg–Skjern Regional train	Varde North towards Skjern
Varde Kaserne towards Esbjerg	Esbjerg–Nørre Nebel Local train	Frisvadvej towards Nørre Nebel
Location

Varde railway station (Danish: Varde Station or Danish: Varde Banegård) is the main railway station serving the market town of Varde in West Jutland, Denmark. It is located in central Varde, immediately adjacent to the Varde bus station. It lies on the southeastern edge of the historic town centre, from which it is separated by the Varde River.

Varde station is a railway junction, which is located on the Esbjerg–Struer railway line from Esbjerg to Struer, and is the terminus of the Varde–Nørre Nebel railway line from Varde to Nørre Nebel. The station opened in 1874. It offers regional rail services to Aarhus, Esbjerg, Herning and Skjern, and local train services to Oksbøl and Nørre Nebel, operated by GoCollective.

The station building from 1874 by the Danish architect Niels Peder Christian Holsøe was listed in the Danish registry of protected buildings and places in 1992.

== History ==
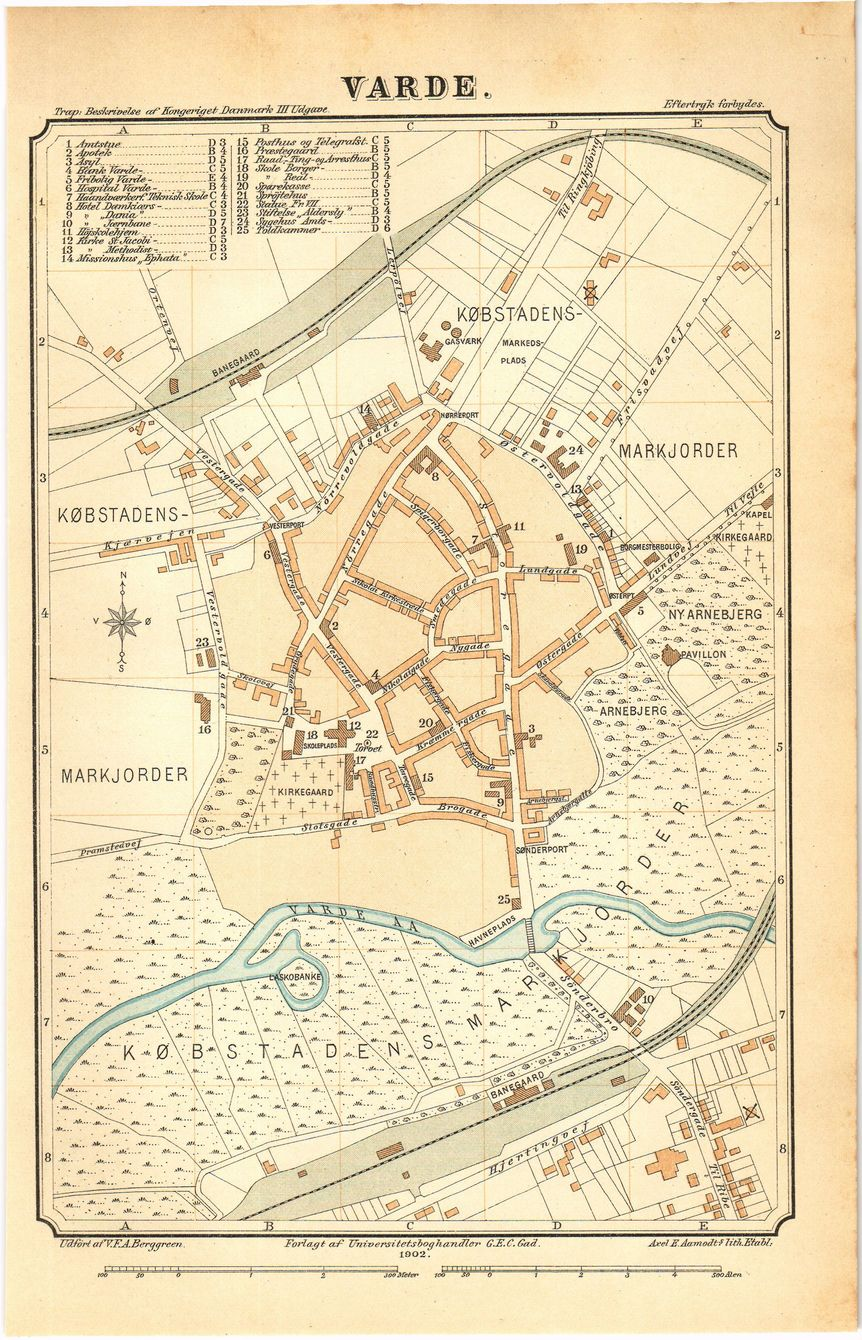
Map of Varde in 1902

The station opened on 3 October 1874 as the section from Esbjerg to Varde of the new Esbjerg–Struer railway line opened, together with the Lunderskov–Esbjerg railway line. On 8 August 1875, the railway line was prolonged to the north as the section from Varde to Ringkøbing opened. The West Jutland longitudinal railway line was thus completed, and connected Varde to the rest of Denmark's railway lines at both ends.

On 15 March 1903 Varde station also became the southeastern terminus of the new Varde–Nørre Nebel railway line (Danish: Vestbanen), which connected Varde with the villages of Oksbøl and Nørre Nebel. On 13 April 1919 Varde station also became the southwestern terminus of the Varde–Grindsted railway line which connected Varde with the railway junction of Grindsted. The Varde–Grindsted railway line closed on 31 March 1972, so that today only the Varde–Nørre Nebel railway line remains as a branch line from Varde station.

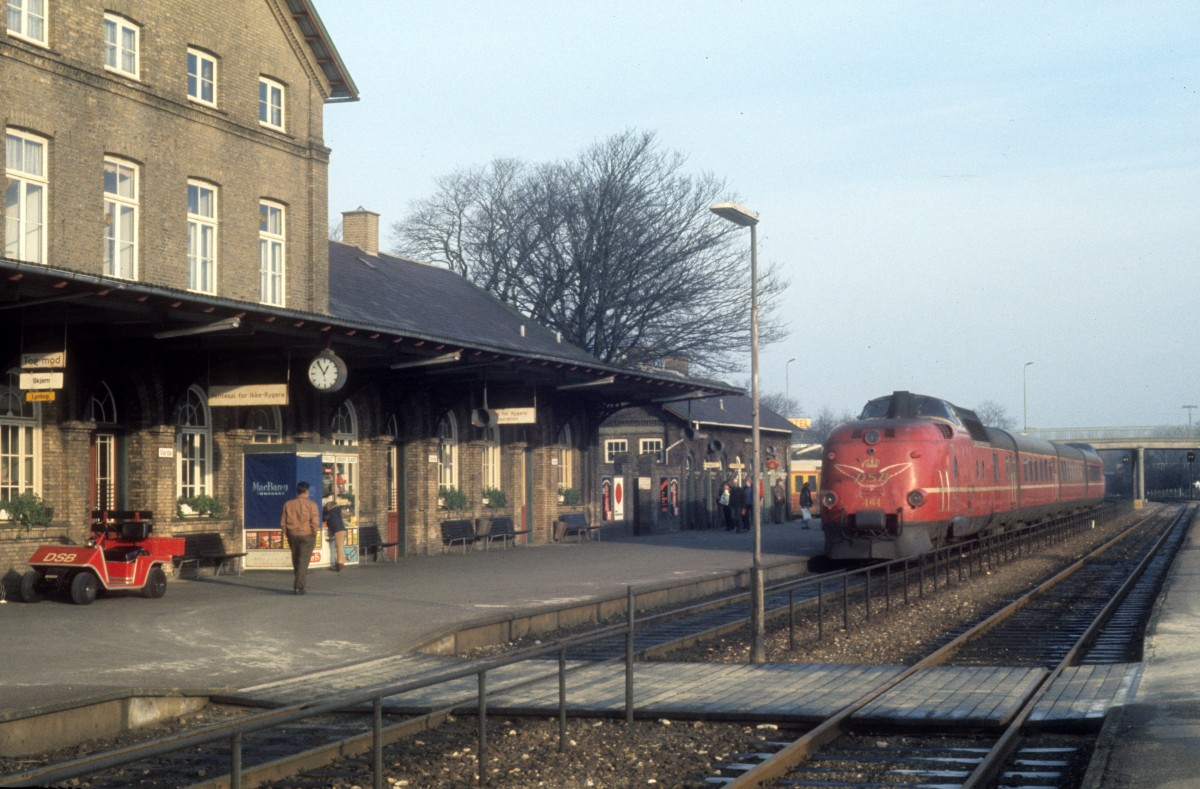
Express train from DSB calling at Varde station in 1975

Since 1 June 2002, the passenger train services on the Varde–Nørre Nebel railway line have been operated by the multinational railway company Arriva on behalf of the operating company Vestbanen A/S. And in 2003, operation of the passenger rail services on the Esbjerg–Struer railway line were transferred from the national railway company DSB to Arriva along with the passenger rail services on the other railway lines in Mid– and West Jutland. The station's kiosk operated by DSB closed in 2007, and in 2016 Arriva closed the station's ticket sales and the waiting room in the station building which has since been unused.

== Architecture ==
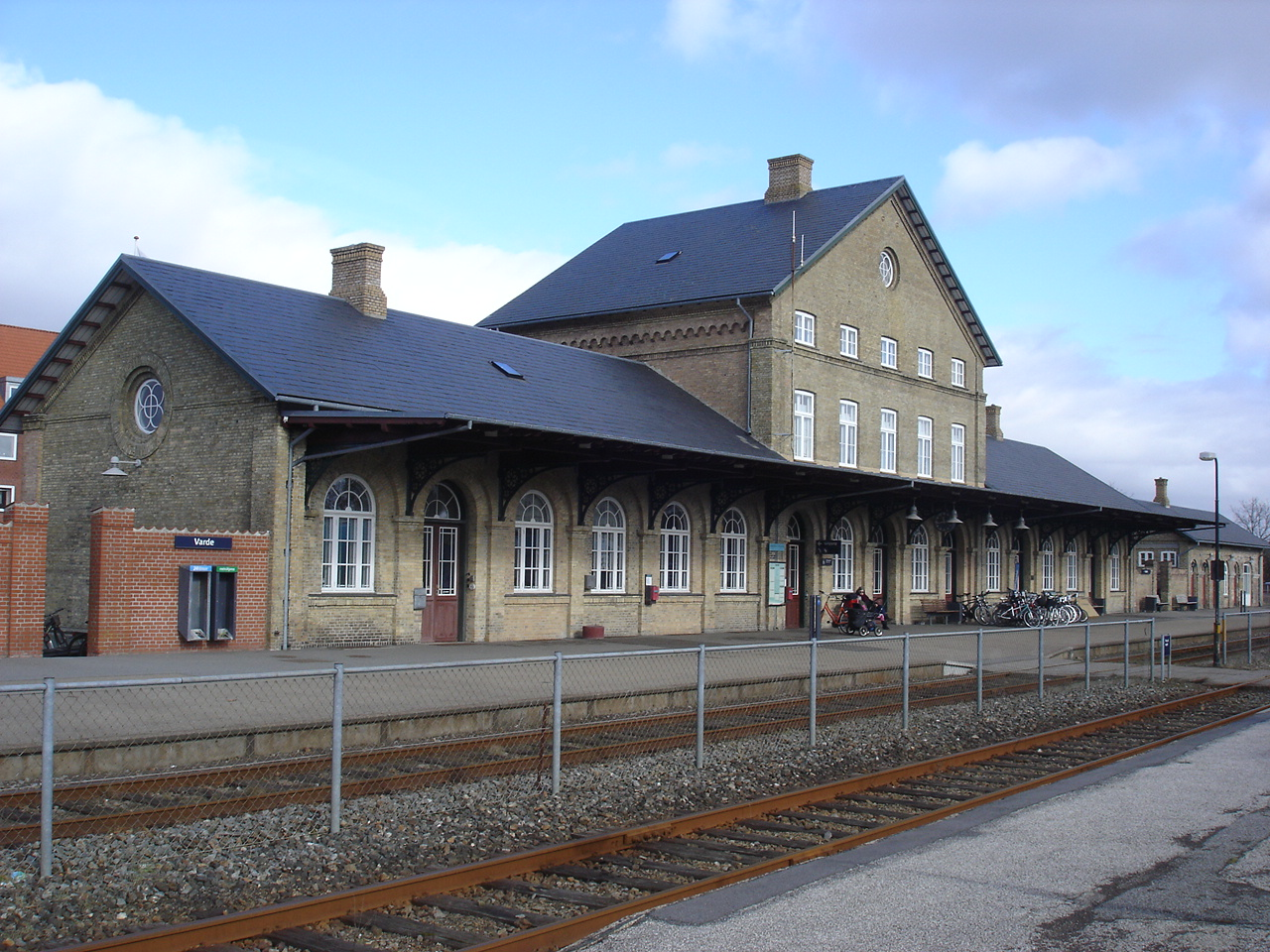
Platform facade of the station building in 2013

The still existing station building from 1874 was built to designs by the Danish architect Niels Peder Christian Holsøe (1826–1895), known for the numerous railway stations he designed across Denmark in his capacity of head architect of the Danish State Railways. Prior to his appointment, Holsøe had developed a standardized station building in the Romanesque Revival architecture Rundbogenstil that was popular in the architecture of the Germanic world at the time. These station buildings consisted of a high transverse central section flanked by two lower one-story shoulder parts. The station building was listed in the Danish registry of protected buildings and places in 1992.

== Facilities ==
The accessible station offers ticket machines, waiting shelters, toilets as well as car and bicycle parking.

Adjacent to the station is the Varde bus terminal.

== Services ==
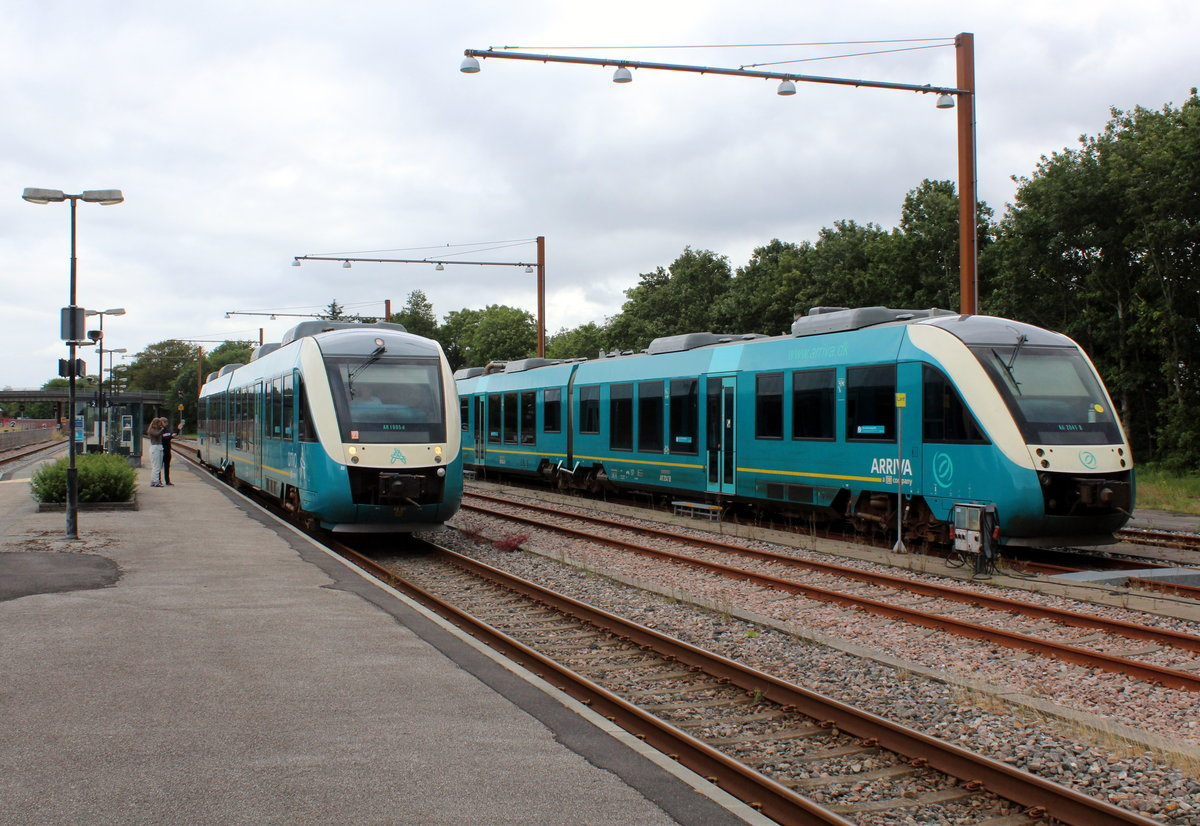
Train to Esbjerg calling at Varde station in 2020

The station offers direct regional rail services to Esbjerg, Skjern, Herning and Aarhus, as well as local train services to Oksbøl and Nørre Nebel in the northwestern part of Varde Municipality, all operated by the private public transport operating company GoCollective.

== See also ==
- List of railway stations in Denmark
- Rail transport in Denmark
- History of rail transport in Denmark
- Transport in Denmark
