= Oksbøl =

- Town
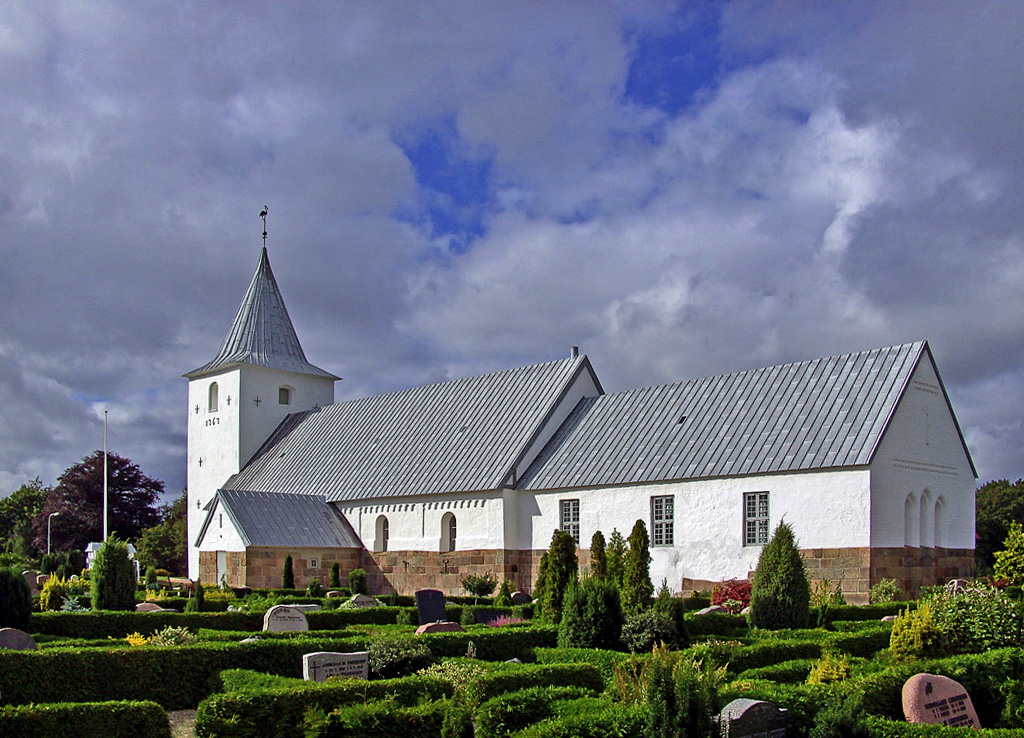
- Ål Church in Oksbøl

- Location in Denmark Oksbøl (Region of Southern Denmark)
- Coordinates: 55°37′33″N 8°16′45″E
- Country: Denmark
- Region: Southern Denmark (Syddanmark)
- Municipality: Varde

Area
  - Urban: 2.3 km^{2} (0.89 sq mi)
- Elevation: 16 m (52 ft)

Population (2026)
  - Urban: 2,885
  - Urban density: 1,300/km^{2} (3,200/sq mi)
- Time zone: UTC+1 (CET)
  - Summer (DST): UTC+2 (CEST)
- Postal code: DK-6840 Oksbøl

Oksbøl is a town in southwestern Jutland in the Varde Municipality, in Region of Southern Denmark. As of 1 January 2026, it has a population of 2,885. Oksbøl is located 14 km west of Varde and 23 km northwest of Esbjerg.

Oksbøl Refugee Camp houses the refugee museum FLUGT, which opened in 2022. The museum describes the story of refugees from various conflicts throughout history as well as convey the history of the refugee camp. The museum is designed by Bjarke Ingels Group.

Oksbøl is connected to the rest of Jutland via the town's two railway stations, Oksbøl and Baunhøj on the Vestbanen railway line, which runs trains between Nørre Nebel and Esbjerg via Varde.

== Notable people ==
- Æ Tinuser (in English The Tinus brothers) from Vrøgum, near Oksbøl, a Danish traditional band from the 1950s to the late 1970s
