= Nørre Nebel railway station =

Railway station in West Jutland, Denmark

Nørre Nebel
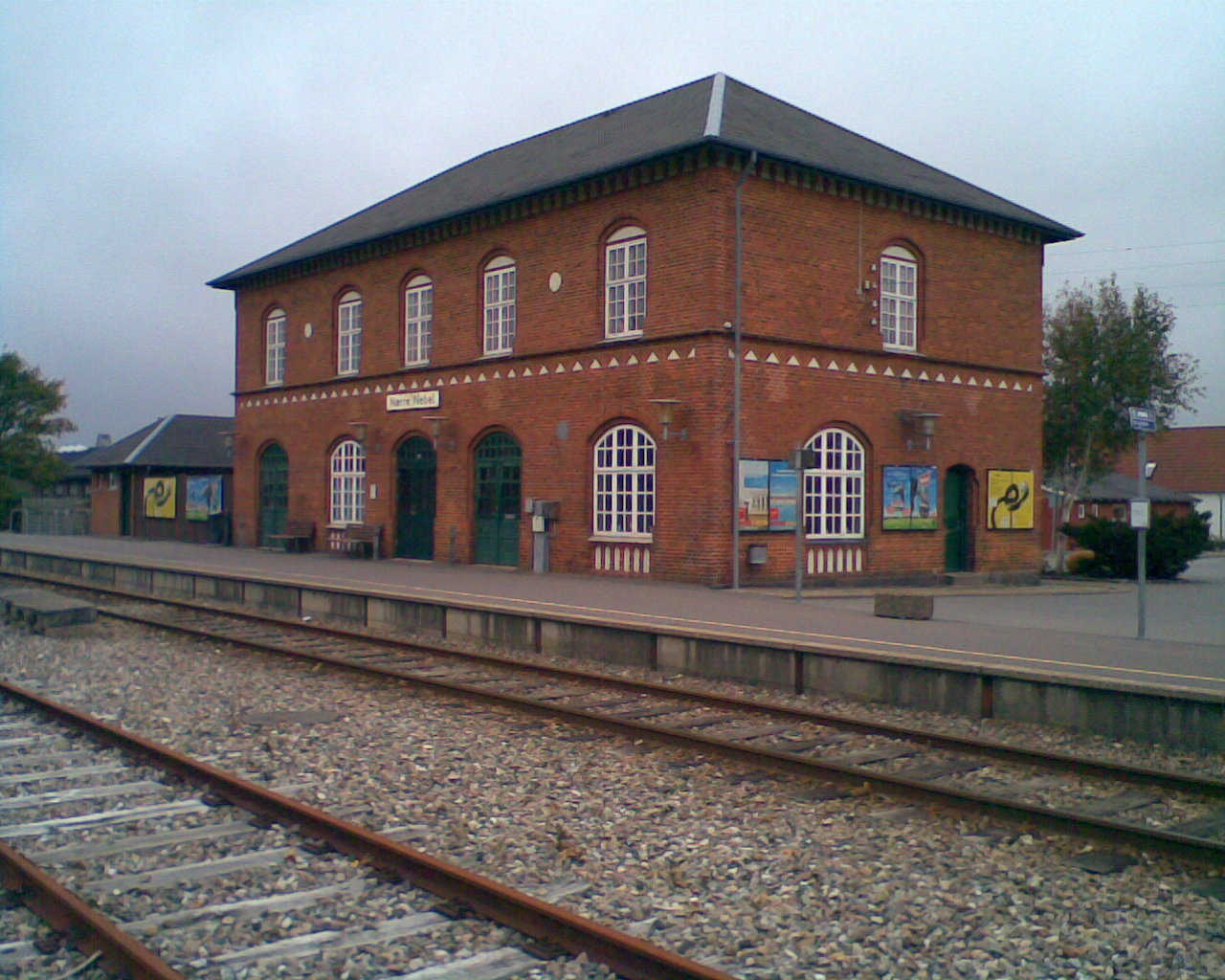
- Platform facade of Nørre Nebel station

General information
- Location: Bredgade 45; 6830 Nørre Nebel; Varde Municipality; Denmark
- Coordinates: 55°46′38″N 8°17′26″E
- Elevation: 7.8 metres (26 ft)
- Owner: Vestbanen A/S
- Lines: Varde–Nørre Nebel; Nørre Nebel–Tarm (closed 1940)
- Platforms: 2
- Tracks: 2
- Train operators: GoCollective

Construction
- Architect: Heinrich Wenck

History
- Opened: 15 March 1903

Services
Preceding station	GoCollective	Following station
Lunde towards Esbjerg	Esbjerg–Nørre Nebel Local train	Terminus
Location

Nørre Nebel railway station is a railway station serving the small railway town of Nørre Nebel in West Jutland, Denmark.

The station is the northern terminus of the Varde–Nørre Nebel railway line from Varde to Nørre Nebel via Oksbøl. The station opened in 1903. The train services are currently operated by GoCollective which run frequent local train services from Nørre Nebel to Varde and Esbjerg with onward connections from there to the rest of Denmark.

== History ==
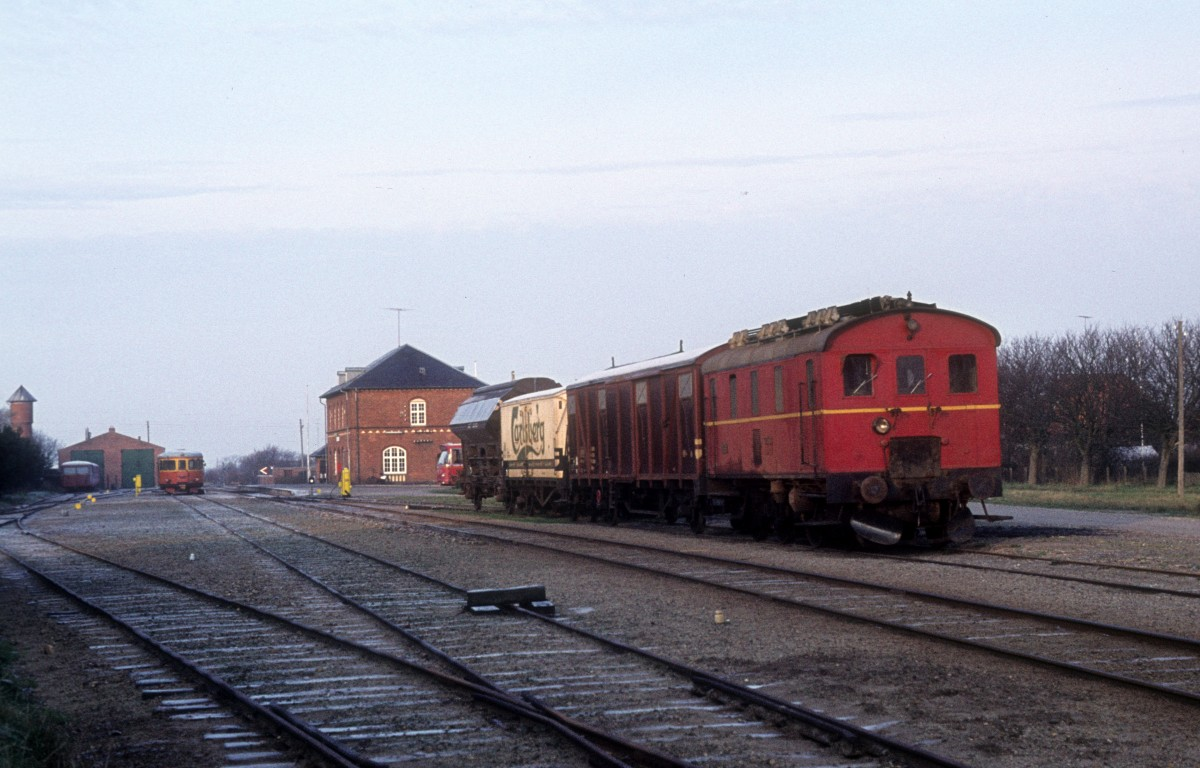
Freight train from Vestbanen at Nørre Nebel station in 1975.

The station opened on 15 March 1903 to serve as the northern terminus of the new railway line from Varde to Nørre Nebel. In 1913, the railway line was extended from Nørre Nebel to Tarm on the Esbjerg–Struer railway line, but this section was closed again in 1940.

== Architecture ==
The original and still existing station building from 1903 was built to designs by the Danish architect Heinrich Wenck (1851–1936), known for the numerous railway stations he designed across Denmark in his capacity of head architect of the Danish State Railways.

== Operations ==
=== Train services ===
The train services are currently operated by the private public transport operating company GoCollective which run frequent local train services from Nørre Nebel station to Varde and Esbjerg with onward connections from there to the rest of Denmark.

== See also ==
- List of railway stations in Denmark
- Rail transport in Denmark
