= Esbjerg station =

Railway station in Esbjerg, Denmark

Esbjerg
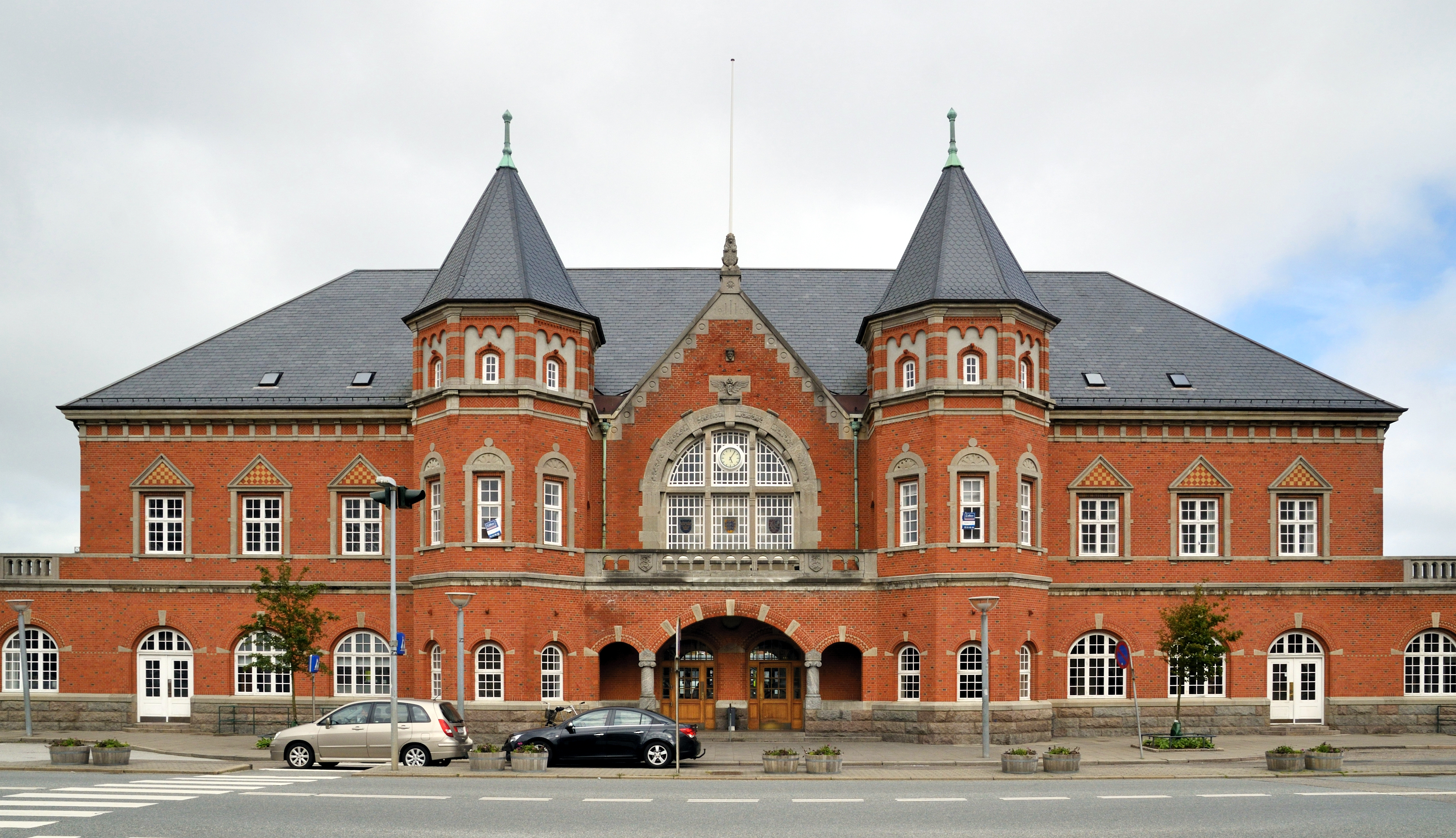
- Front facade of Esbjerg station

General information
- Location: Jernbanegade 35; 6700 Esbjerg; Esbjerg Municipality; Denmark
- Coordinates: 55°28′04″N 08°27′33″E
- Elevation: 12.8 metres (42 ft)
- Owner: DSB (station infrastructure); Banedanmark (rail infrastructure)
- Lines: Lunderskov–Esbjerg; Esbjerg–Struer
- Platforms: 4
- Tracks: 4
- Train operators: DSB; GoCollective

Construction
- Architect: Heinrich Wenck (1904)

History
- Opened: 1874
- Rebuilt: 1904
- Electrified: 2016

Services
Preceding station	DSB	Following station
Bramming towards Østerport	Copenhagen–Esbjerg InterCity	Terminus
Bramming towards Aalborg	Aalborg–Esbjerg InterCity	Terminus
Preceding station	GoCollective	Following station
Terminus	Esbjerg–Skjern Regional train	Spangsbjerg towards Skjern
Terminus	Esbjerg–Nørre Nebel Local train	Spangsbjerg towards Nørre Nebel
Terminus	Esbjerg–Niebüll Regional train	Jerne towards Niebüll
Location

Esbjerg station (Danish: Esbjerg Banegård or Esbjerg Station) is the main railway station in the city of Esbjerg in southwest Jutland, Denmark. It is located in central Esbjerg, immediately adjacent to the Esbjerg bus station. It lies on the eastern edge of the historic town centre, between the districts of Indre By and Rørkjær.

It is the terminal station on the Lunderskov–Esbjerg line and the Esbjerg–Struer line. The train services from the station are operated by DSB and GoCollective, and the station serves destinations including Copenhagen, Aarhus and Ribe.

The station was opened in 1874, and the present building, designed by Heinrich Wenck, was completed in 1904. With its three-storey towers flanking the central gable, it reflects a mixture of Historicist styles, some inspired by Dutch Renaissance architecture.

== History ==
The first railway station in Esbjerg was inaugurated in October 1874 on Exnersgade. It was the terminus of the West Jutland line (Jyske Vestbane) from Struer to Esbjerg and of the South Jutland line (Jyske Sydbane) from Lunderskov near Kolding to Esbjerg, both being built from 1872 to 1875. Opposite the first station, a number of houses were completed in the 1890s. In 1904, Wenck's new station was opened on Jernbanegade.

== Architecture ==
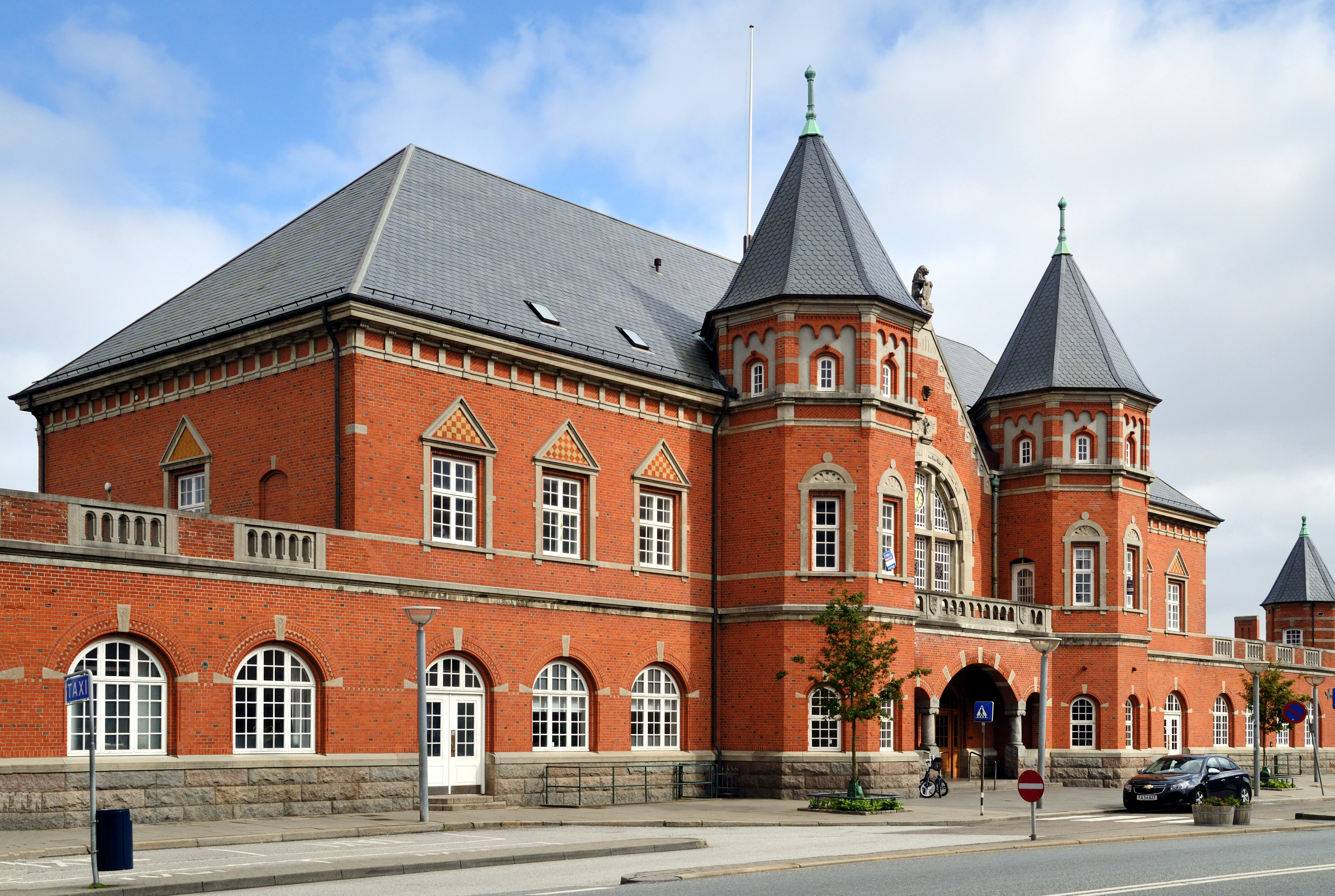
Esbjerg station

Wenck's two-storey red-brick building with a slate roof has two striking towers, three storeys high, on either side of the recessed entrance. Influenced by international trends, it reflects various Historicist styles. The entrance hall with its timbered finish is reminiscent of Tyrolean designs. The building is in excellent condition following recent restoration.

Heinrich Wenck who was employed by the national railway company had completed a number of station buildings, often working with his predecessor N.P.C. Holsøe, before he designed Esbjerg station in 1902. He was influenced by the rich, National Romantic style of Martin Nyrop which drew on stately Dutch Renaissance decorations and details. Features include a central gabled section with a large lunette window flanked by twin towers. At the time, lunettes were widely used for illuminating station halls. The tall symmetrical complex has hipped roofs with smaller towers at each end. The building was completed the same year as Copenhagen Central Station with which it bears similarities.

== Destinations ==
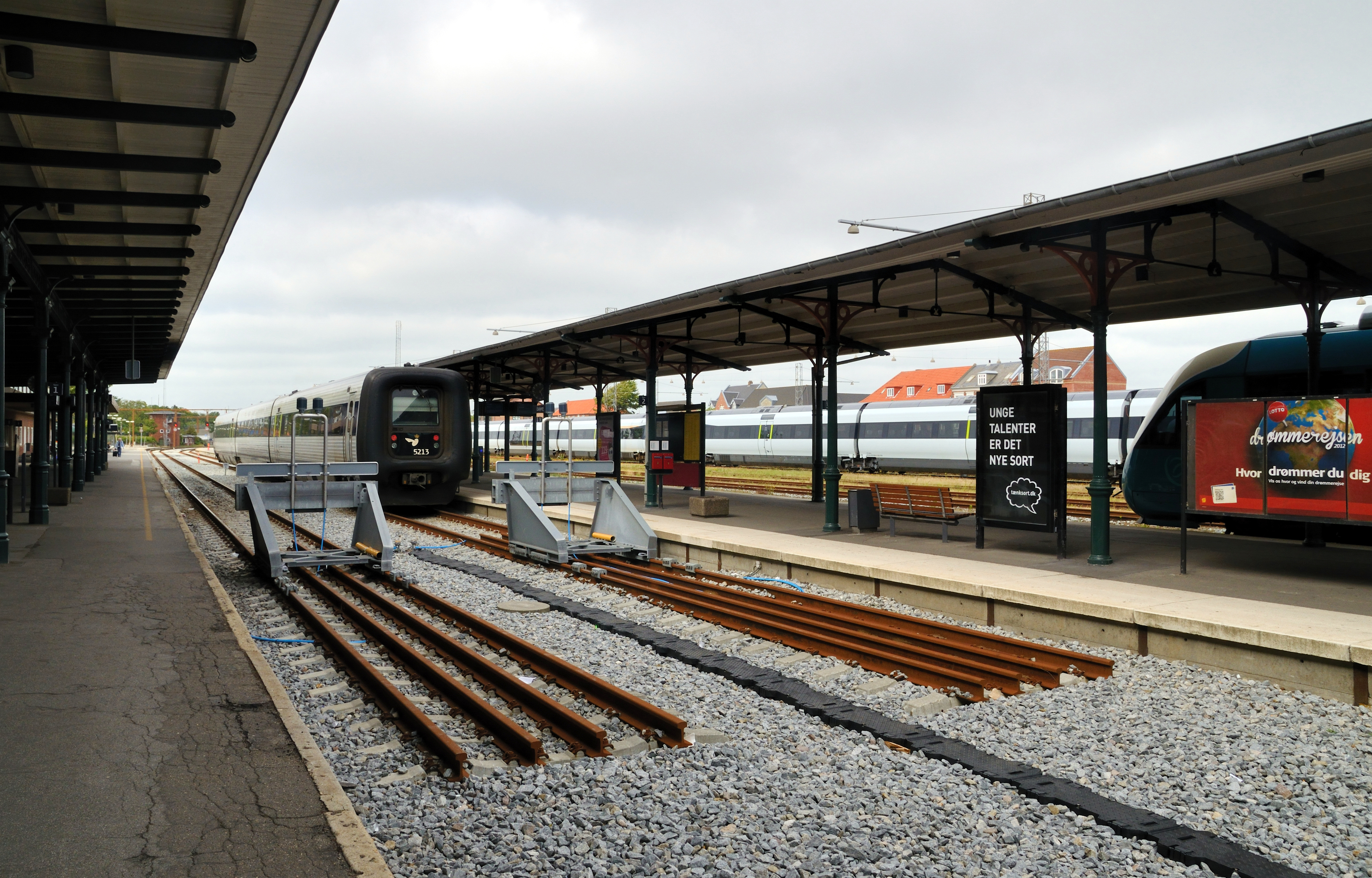
Esbjerg station

Esbjerg station currently serves destinations including Copenhagen, Aarhus, Ribe, Skjern and Niebüll in Germany. Both DSB and GoCollective make use of Esbjerg station.

The most popular destination is the nearby town of Bramming, which accounted for 14% of departing passengers in 2017. Other popular destinations include Odense, Ribe and Varde, all with respectively 8%.

== Cultural references ==
Esbjerg station is used as a location in the 1938 Danish thriller film Blaavand melder storm.

== See also ==
- List of railway stations in Denmark
- Rail transport in Denmark
- History of rail transport in Denmark
- Transportation in Denmark
