= Nørre Nebel =

Town in Jutland, Denmark

- Town
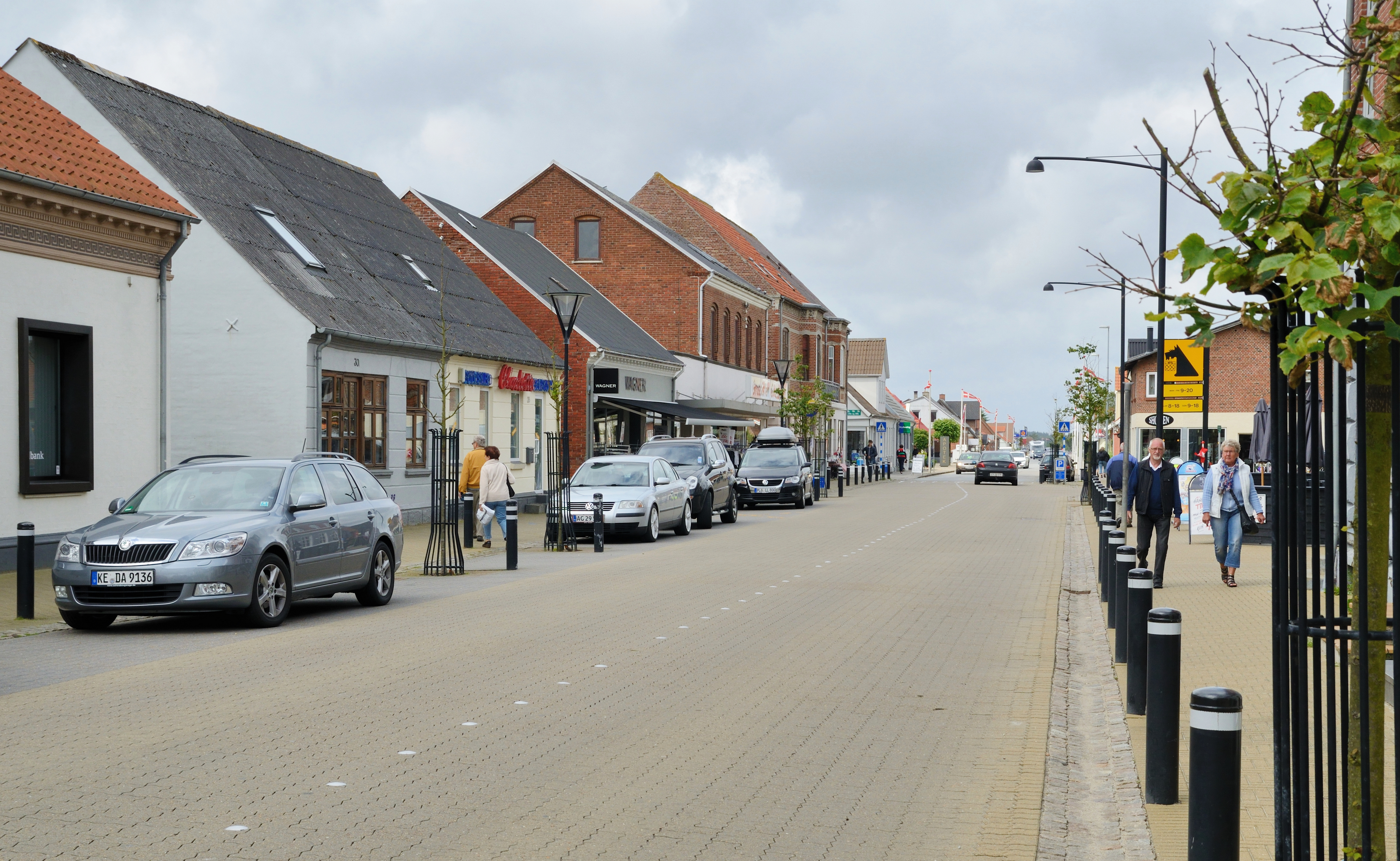
- The main street in Nørre Nebel

- Location in Region of Southern Denmark Nørre Nebel (Denmark)
- Coordinates: 55°46′45″N 8°17′15″E
- Country: Denmark
- Region: Southern Denmark
- Municipality: Varde Municipality

Area
  - Urban: 1.3 km^{2} (0.50 sq mi)

Population (2026)
  - Urban: 1,348
  - Urban density: 1,000/km^{2} (2,700/sq mi)
- Time zone: UTC+1 (CET)
  - Summer (DST): UTC+2 (CEST)
- Postal code: DK-6830 Nørre Nebel

Nørre Nebel is a town in southwest Jutland, Denmark, with a population of 1,348 (1 January 2026). The town is influenced by tourism, and most of the inhabitants are working with handicrafts, trade or services. Nørre Nebel is located about 23 kilometres (14 mi) from Varde and Tarm.

The town is served by Nørre Nebel railway station, the northern terminus of the Varde–Nørre Nebel railway line.

== Sources ==
- "BEF44: Population 1st January, by urban areas" database from Statistics Denmark
- http://www.maplandia.com/denmark/ribe/blabjerg/norre-nebel/
