= Varde =

City in southern Denmark

- Town
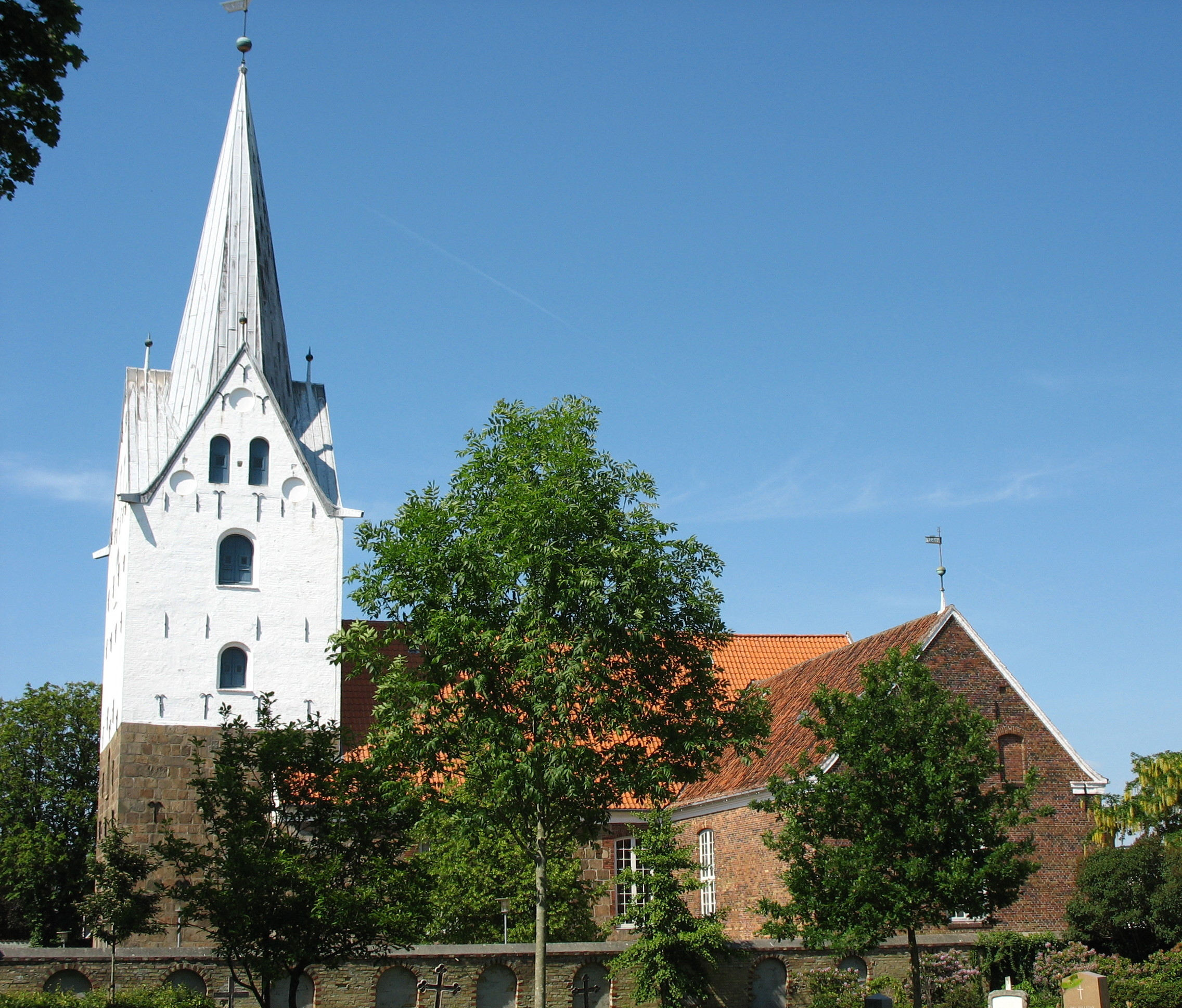
- Church of Sct. Jacob in Varde

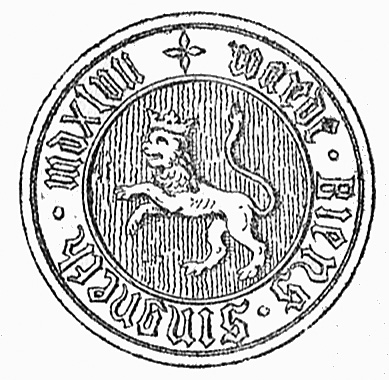
- Seal Coat of arms
- Motto: Varde, town of commerce or We in nature
- Location in Denmark Varde (Region of Southern Denmark)
- Coordinates: 55°37′12″N 8°28′50″E
- Country: Denmark
- Region: Southern Denmark
- Municipality: Varde Municipality
- Established: Approx. 1100

Government
  - Mayor: Mads Sørensen

Area
  - Urban: 9.9 km^{2} (3.8 sq mi)

Population (2026)
  - Urban: 14,317
  - Urban density: 1,400/km^{2} (3,700/sq mi)
  - Gender: 7,069 males and 7,248 females
- Demonym: Vardenser
- Time zone: UTC+1 (CET)
  - Summer (DST): UTC+2 (CEST)
- Postal code: DK-6800 Varde

Varde is a Danish city in southwestern Jutland and is the primary city in the municipality of Varde, in Region of Southern Denmark. In 2015 municipality changed its motto to "We in nature" to emphasize its rural atmosphere. The town has an old market environment and is located by Varde stream/river and is a short distance away from the beaches by the North Sea. These features make it a tourist destination. The age of Varde is not known precisely, but it is mentioned in written sources from 1107 A.D. and is therefore thought have been founded sometime in the early Middle Ages.

== The history of Varde ==
Early on the name of Varde is presented in 2 different versions "Warwath" and "Warwik." War is identical in both and is believed to mean grassland, maybe beach or in other ways uncultivated area. The suffixes "wath" and "wick" are believed to mean respectively ford and inlet. The differing versions of the name occur quite naturally, depending on where you are located "on ground" or "on water". As with other older Danish towns, Varde is located, where the countryside in different ways favors human settlement and other human activity. The town was founded near a stream allowing a convenient port for ships near a place, where north and south bound traffic by land had an important ford/crossing, which was later replaced with a bridge. Varde was from olden times protected against sudden attacks from outsiders, partly because of its distance from the shore and partly because of its neighbourship with the built royal castle/fortress/fort/estate (Vardehus). Vardehus was the administrative center of the district and from this base of power a royal official governed the shire of Varde a sizeable area corresponding to the former Ribe Amt. On the greater scale Varde has never been a big town, but the fact that Varde already in the early Middle Ages had 2 churches, means that it had some status.

=== Royal castles by the stream/river ===
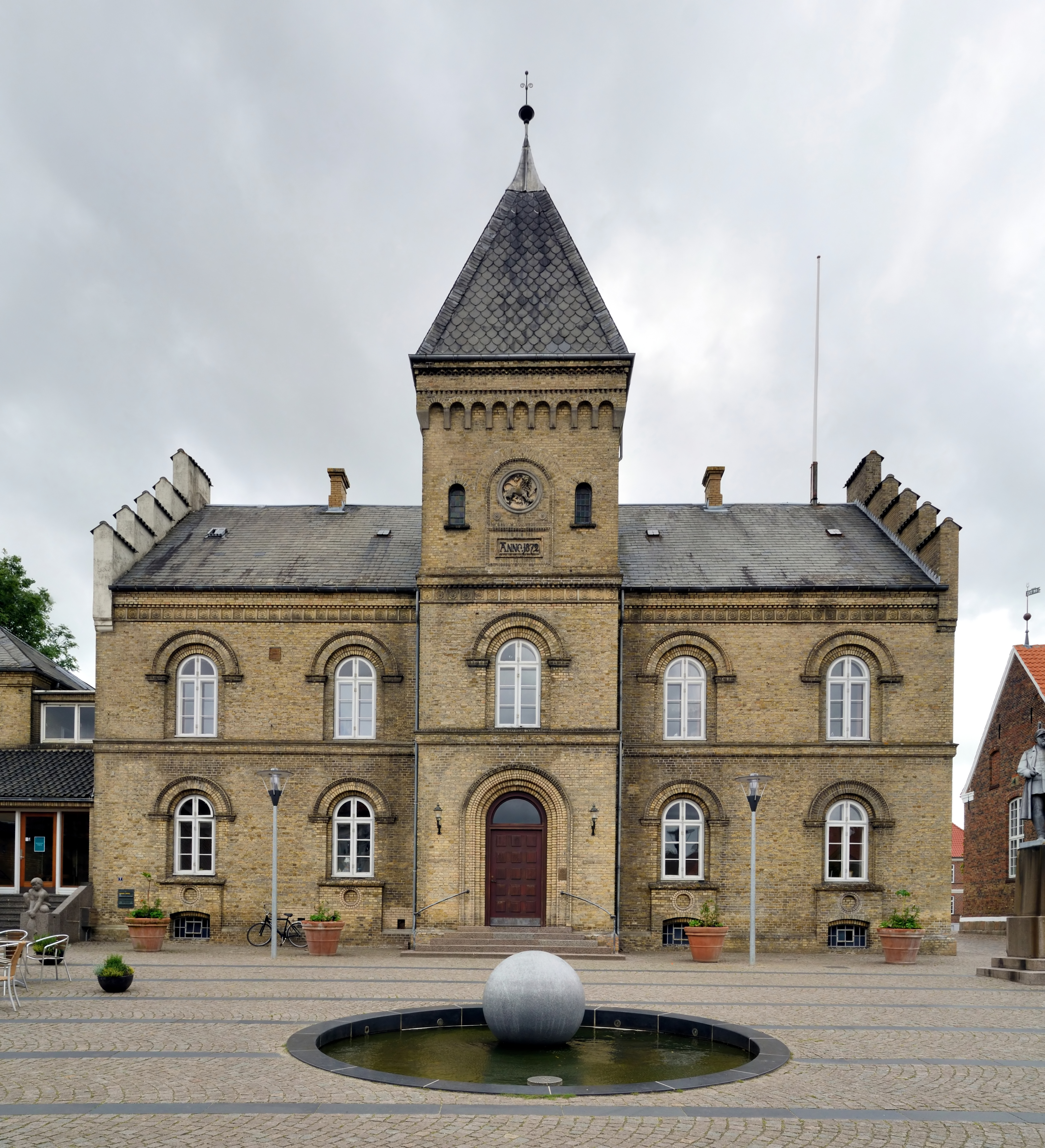
Varde – The old town hall, with the black pearl in front

Written sources from the 12th century repeatedly mention the royal official/caretaker in Varde. In his capacity of being the representative of the king in the shire of Varde, this high level official must have resided in the local royal estate/castle – Vardehus. The oldest castle lay to the vest of the town, by the stream/river of Varde.

Around the beginning of the 14th century Vardehus was moved to an islet in the stream/river near the southern edge of the town. During an uprising in 1439 this new Vardehus II was stormed, pillaged and destroyed by rebel farmers. Later that same year the council of the state retaliated by burning down the town of Varde. Lesser excavations have been made on both sites, and the findings are kept in Varde museum. It is also known, that during the Viking ages there was a camp near the school of Sct. Jacob.

=== Borough/Market town 1442 ===
The borough sigil of Varde is the oldest town arms in Denmark. It depicts a blue shield with a walking golden leopard with a red tongue. It looks somewhat like a lion, but golden leopard is the official denomination. It is very similar to the sigil of Uppsala kommun, Sweden.

From the beginning, commerce together with arts and crafts have been closely linked to being a town and when Christopher of Bavaria in August 1442 awarded Varde its first borough/market town privileges, it had already functioned as a borough/market town for a long time. Most importantly this meant, that peasants trading goods in country stores was outlawed, but at the same time, that the merchants of the town were now officially recognized as having exclusive rights to conducting trade in the town. Although the royal letter of privilege from 1442 has been long lost, the text is known from a transcript from 1648.

=== The town square of Varde ===
By the town square of Varde lays amongst others the Church of Sct. Jacob from the 12th century, Sillasens house from 1797, the old town hall from 1872 and Den Schultzske Gaard 1796/97.

Around 1900 there was a livestock market on the town square, and for a period in the middle of the 20th century a bus station. 2014/2015 the town square was renovated/renewed as it also was in 2003. 2003 landscape architect Charlotte Horn was inspired by the stream/river of Varde and the characteristic Varde clam with the black pearl, when reshaping the town square. In front of the old town hall of Varde is a basin with a big black round rock symbolizing the Varde pearl. From here a stream symbolizing the stream/river of Varde runs through a part of the town square. The webcam of the library of Varde takes pictures of the square around the clock and here the "stream" is visible.

== The municipality of Varde ==
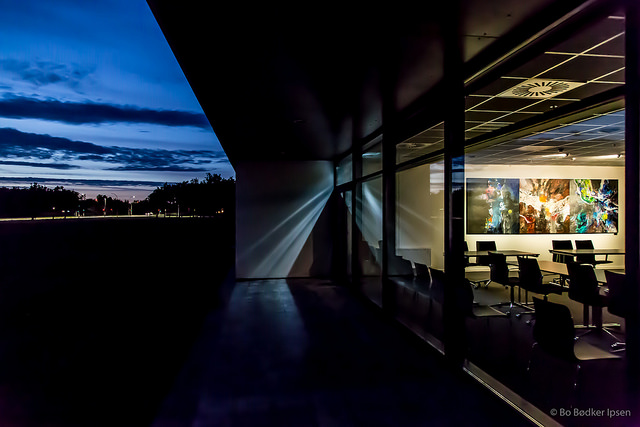
Tyrrestrup painting at night at the new town hall of Varde

The current municipality of Varde was formed in 2007, following structural reforms in Denmark, which meant that the old municipality of Varde was merged with the municipalities of Blaabjerg, Blåvandshuk, Helle and Ølgod, which together formed fifth biggest municipality in Denmark measuring in square kilometres, with 1,240 square kilometres (480 sq mi).

Varde is the main town in the municipality of Varde and is with its 13,771 inhabitants the biggest town in the municipality, followed by Ølgod and Oksbøl with respectively 3853 and 2852 inhabitants. All in all there are 50.122 inhabitants with permanent residence in the municipality of Varde. These are, in vacation periods, supplemented by large quantities of tourists visiting the Coastal region of Varde, especially in and around the towns of Blåvand(Oksby), Henne Strand and Vejers Strand, that grow accordingly.

The town hall of the municipality of Varde is at home at Bytoften 2 in Varde, where the new town hall opened its doors in the summer of 2015. During the opening of the new facilities the municipality received a work of art from local artist Hans Tyrrestrup, which it had commissioned, consisting of one poem and three paintings under the title "Sonate for sol," which means "Sonata for the sun." This work of art now adorns the council chamber of the town hall.

== Geography ==
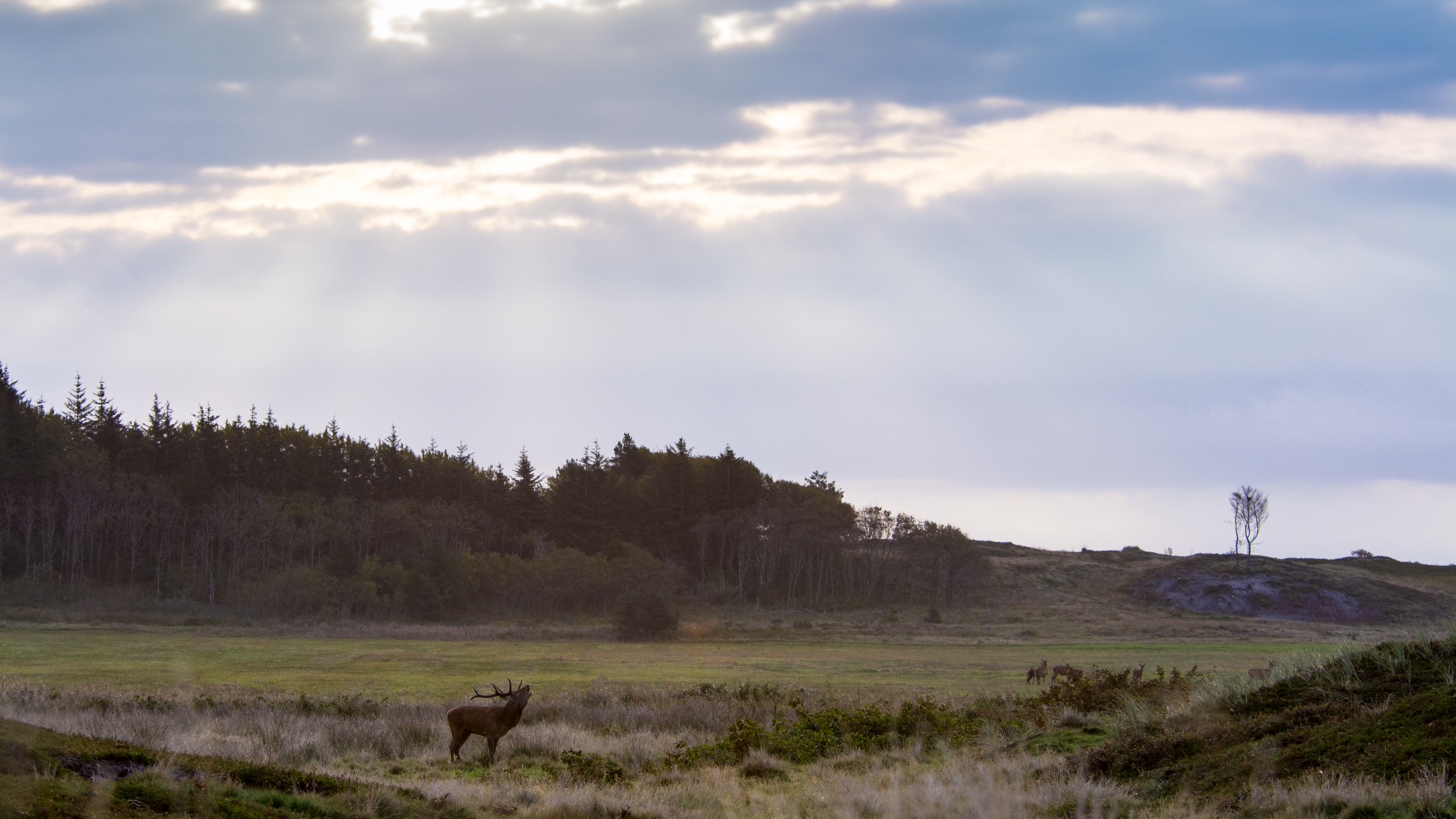
Red Deer in Varde nature

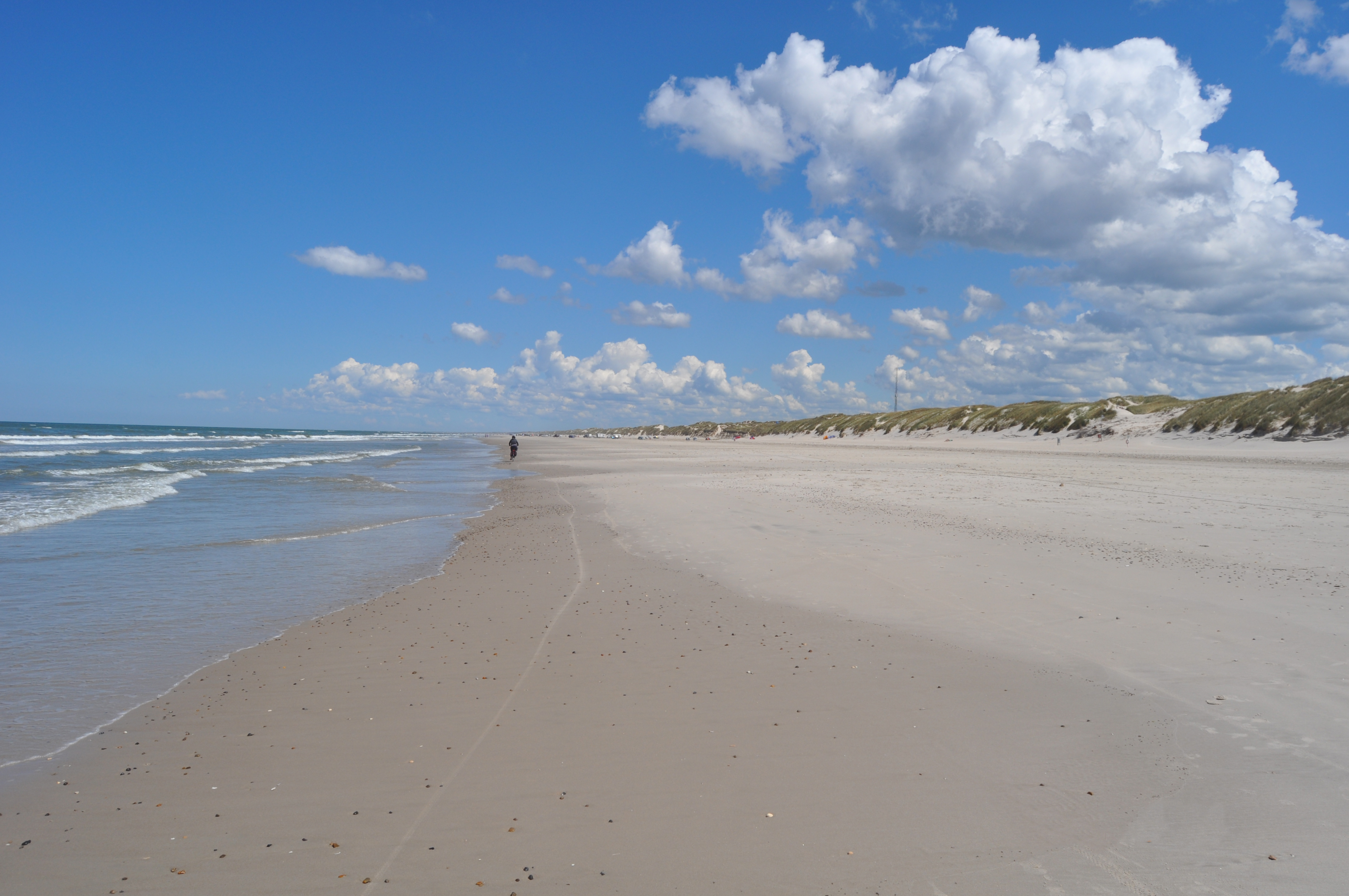
Vejers beach

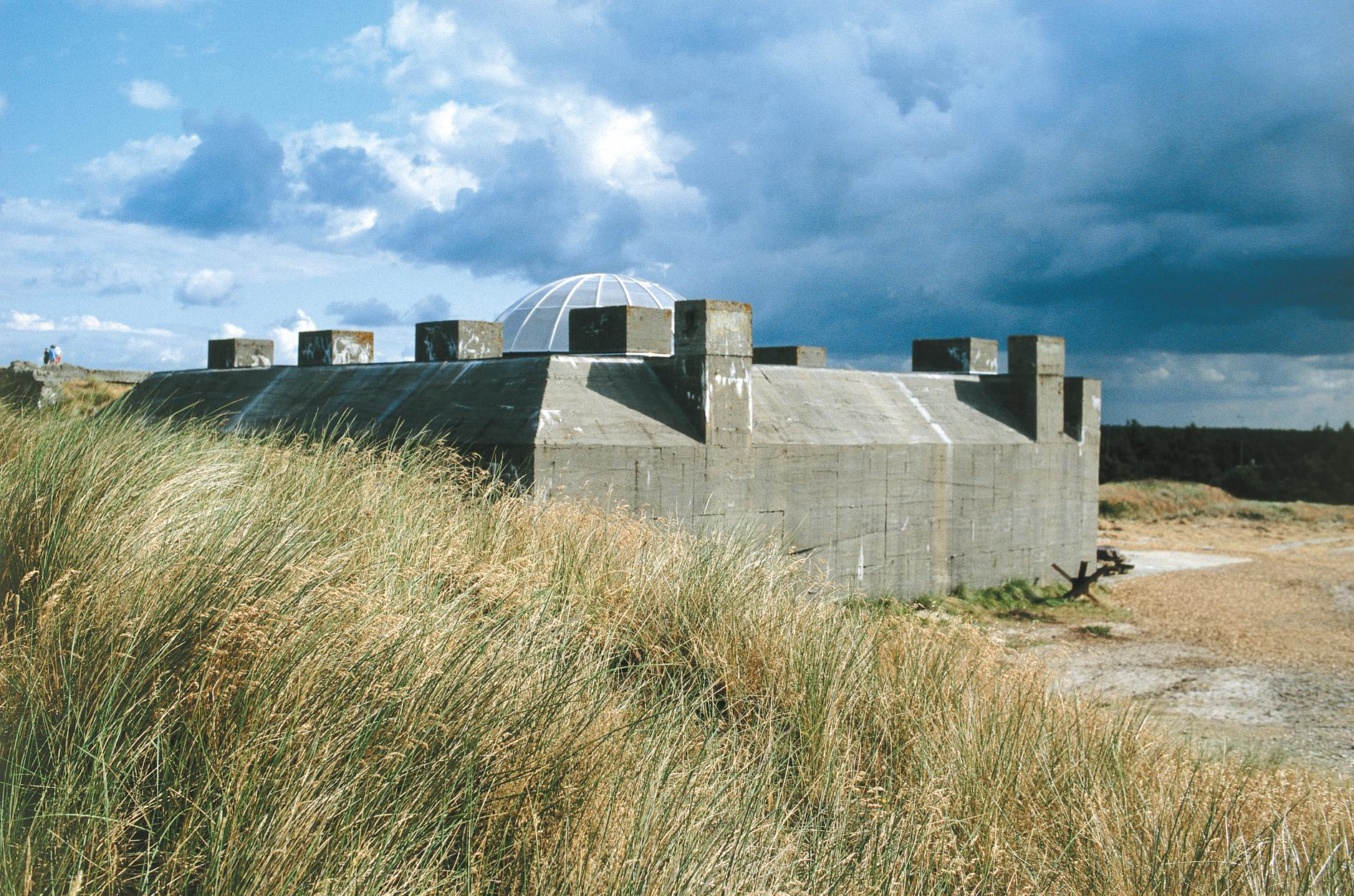
Tirpitz position

Varde stretches from Ansager in the east to Blåvands Huk in the west and from Skallingen in the south to Nymindegab/Ølgod in the north. A variety of different types of landscape types are thus at home in Varde, partly due to the size of the municipality.

Following the vision and motto "We in nature", attention has again been drawn to the possibilities in the diversity and unspoiled nature of Varde. This has led to investment to make the nature accessible to visitors, both permanent residents and holidaymakers.

At the municipality of Varde "Wadden Sea National park," which in June 2014, together with areas of the Wadden Sea in Germany and the Netherlands, was declared world heritage by UNESCO, meets "Naturpark Vesterhavet," which stretches across an area of 22.500 hectares between Blåvands Huk and Nymindegab. The parks along the western shores of Varde offer an array of different types of landscapes e.g. dune landscapes, heath, dune plantations, coastal lakes, and for the wadden sea, vast areas of mud flats, where the guest can experience the exposed seabed.

Where national park meets nature park you can also experience the western tip of Denmark, adorned by the lighthouse of Blåvand, with the purpose of guiding ships past Horns Rev, where the sandbank(s) stretch far out into the ocean. If you peer across the ocean from the lighthouse you can often see the wind farms of Horns Rev.

Sizeable areas along the coast of Varde are laid out as training areas for the Danish military, but as long as the red signal has not been hoisted, it is accessible to visitors of all types. There are 3 military barracks in the municipality of Varde which can be found in Varde, Oksbøl and Nymindegab. The barracks of Nymindegab look differently from other Danish barracks in general, as it was built in 1941 by the German Wehrmacht as a school for anti-aircraft personnel. The barracks were meant to look like a small village, in order not to be bombed by the allied or British bombers, which it never was.

Just near the barracks of Nymindegab lay the Atlantic Wall, stretching from Nordkapp in Norway to the Pyrenees by the Spanish border. Because of this bunkers lay along the coast as a constant reminder of WW2. Among these the Tirpitz-position (in German: Batterie Vogelsnest), which was being built (but never finished) in order to protect the port of Esbjerg.

Following the Second World War it was necessary to demine the westcoast of Jutland, as the Wehrmacht had mined the coast to stop allied forces from attacking. The demining of the Danish Westcoast was in 2015 problematized in the Danish movie "Land of Mine", in which the conditions for the German soldiers, who demined the Danish westcoast following WW2 were described. More German soldiers died in Denmark demining the beaches following WW2, than during the invasion and the occupation of Denmark from 1940 to 1945.

== Tourist places in and around Varde ==
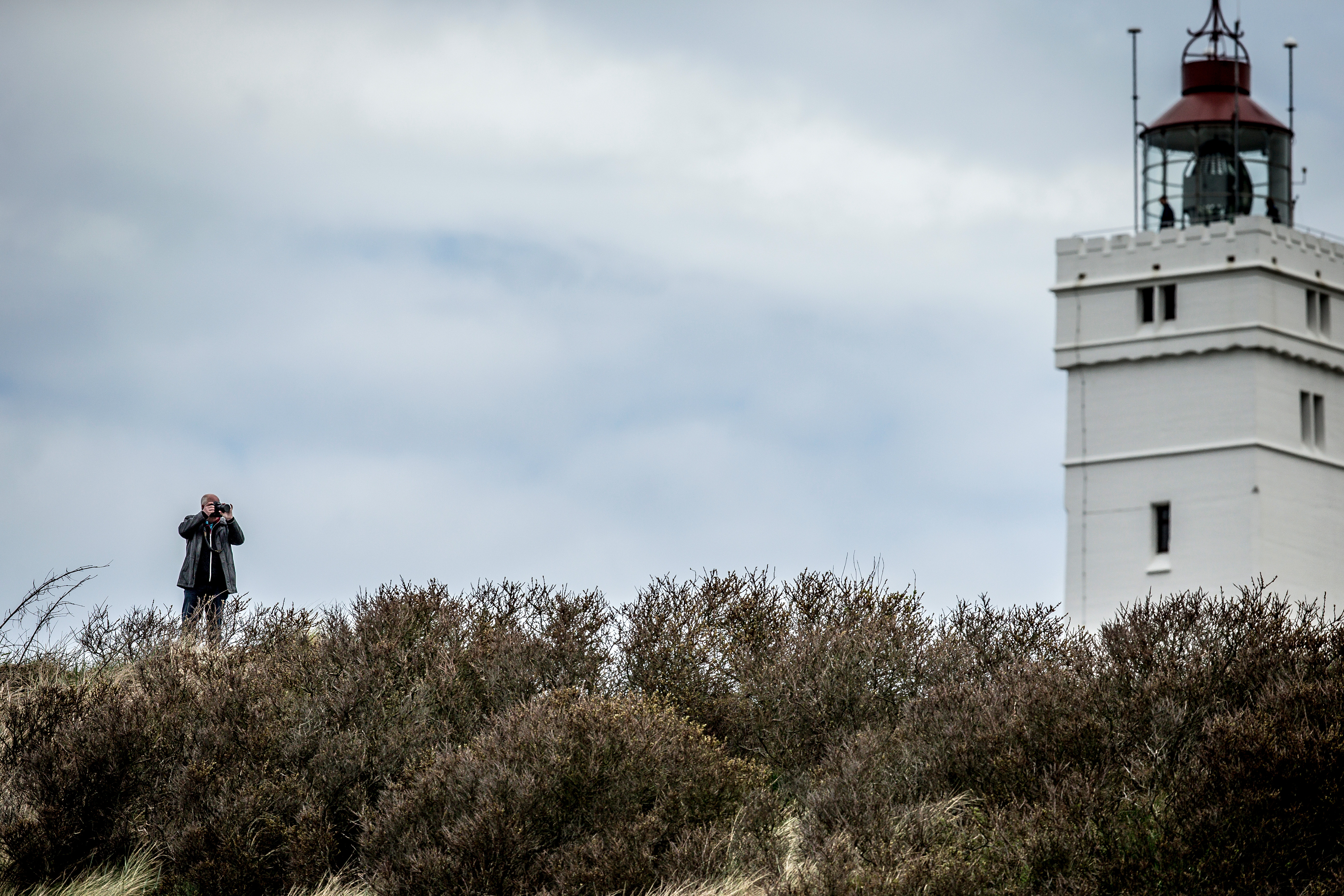
Lighthouse in Blåvand(Varde)

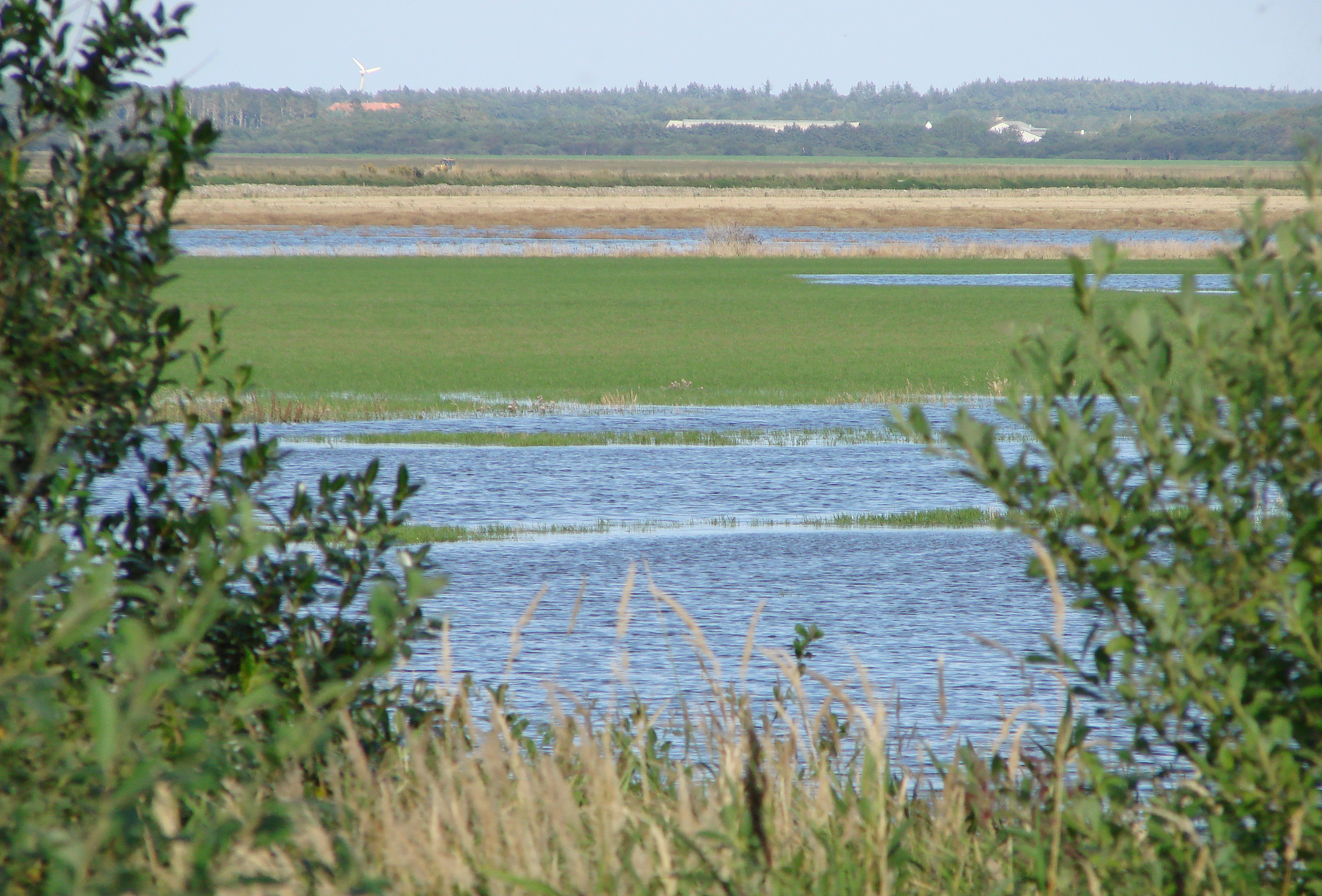
Filsø recovering

- The Museum of Varde town and municipality operates as an umbrella for the museums in the municipality of Varde, among these are e.g. Varde Museum, the Tirpitz-position, Nymindegab museum, the Danish amber museum in Oksbøl and more.
- The Tirpitz Museum, a museum built in an old bunker complex and holds exhibitions about the Atlantic Wall, life on the western coast of Denmark and an amber collection.
- Varde Minitown* in the Arnbjergparken in Varde is a miniature of Varde anno 1866 in the scale 1:10, which is maintained and built by 12 voluntary "mini-masons," whose work, making the miniature houses, you can observe from May to October at their workshop in Varde.
- Blåvands Huk/ The lighthouse of Blåvand, the western tip of Denmark, overlooking the wind farms of Horns Rev.
- The beaches along the shore(s) of Varde are among the top crowd pullers/attractions in Varde and a big part of why Varde is a tourist destination. Among these are the broad white beaches of Blåvand, Vejers Strand and Henne Strand, strand meaning beach in Danish.
- Filsø was once the second largest lake in Denmark, until it, in the middle of the 18th century, was contained and used for agricultural purposes. In 2010 the area was bought up by the nature fund of "Aage W. Jensen Filsø Avlsgods" with the purpose of restoring Filsø to its original state.
- Varde Sommerspil in Varde is held by and performed by the biggest amateur theatre group in Denmark, named "7-kanten" and has for many years been a crowd puller in the summer months.
- Nationalpark Vadehavet (Wadden Sea National park, UNESCO world heritage). Mud flats from Varde in the north to the Netherlands in the south.
- Naturpark Vesterhavet (Vesterhavet/North Sea Nature Park) – 22.500 hectares of nature park between Blåvands Huk and Nymindegab.
- Skallingen – the demining of the Westcoast – Skallingen is a relatively newly formed landmass, which was created by/after a storm surge in 1634, by sediment left behind by the retracting ocean. It is still under transformation and was home to the last minefield in Denmark. Post 2000 the area was demined and opened to the public.
- The Oksbøl Refugee Camp museum and cemetery, Oksbøl housed up to 37,000 German Refugees in Denmark after World War II.

== Arts and building style ==
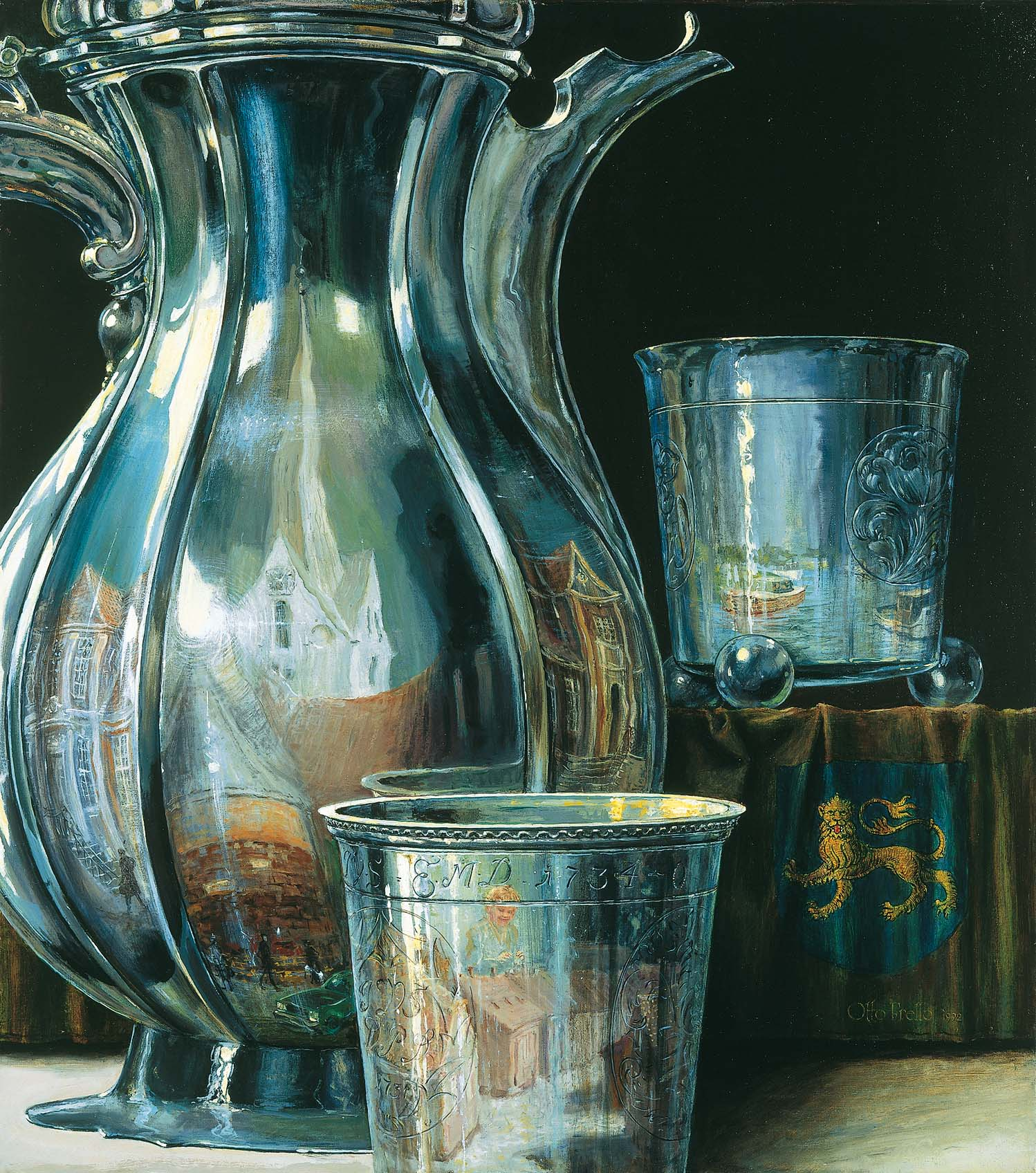
Reflections – by Otto William Frello

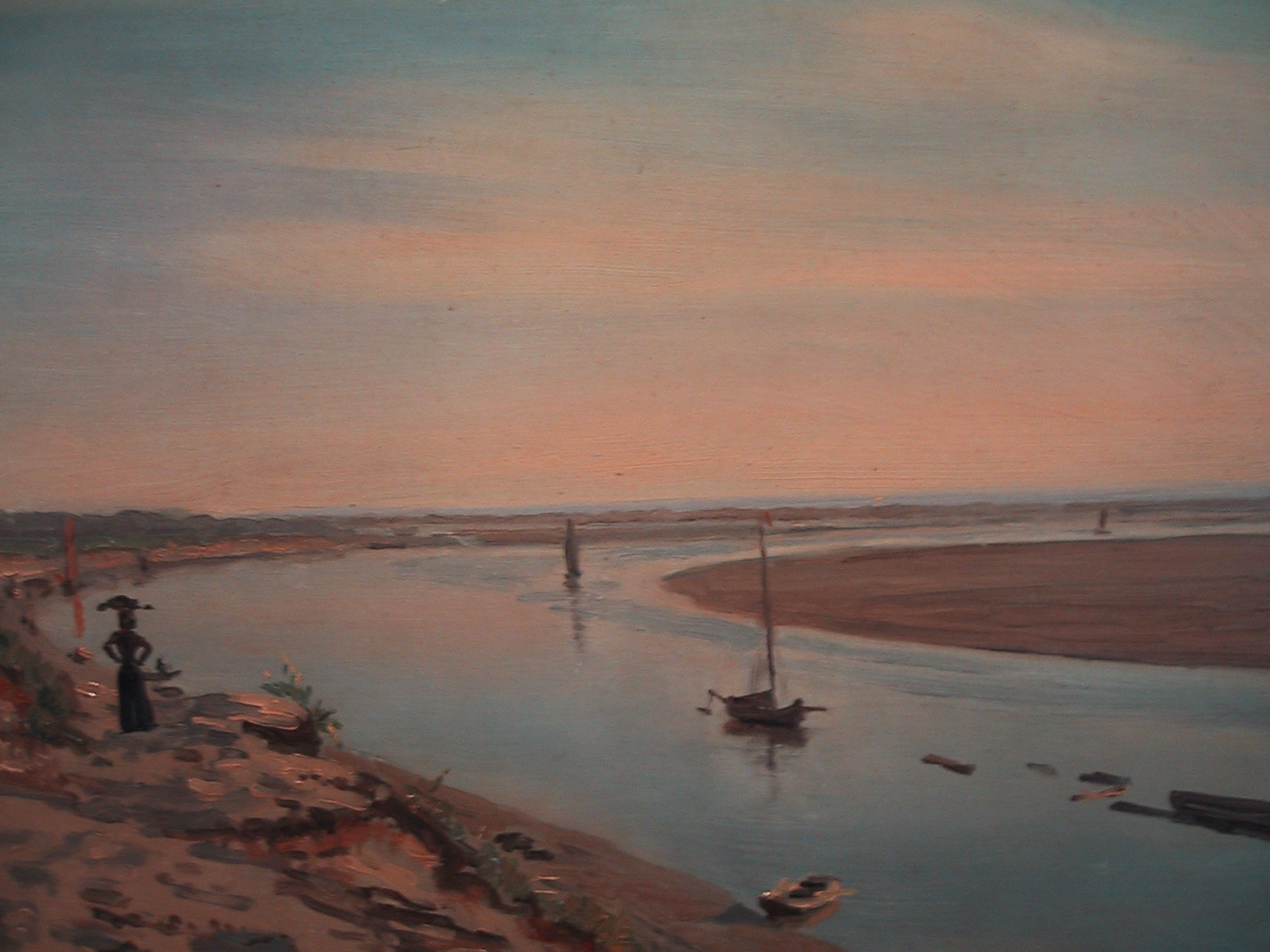
Nymindegab (Laurits Tuxen)

Otto William Frello (died 2015), local artist with permanent exhibition at Varde Museum. Frello is known for his surreal, but at the same time very realistic and detailed paintings.

Laurits Tuxen is known as one of the "Skagensmalerne –painters of Skagen," but already in 1879 visited Nymindegab, where he was one of the founding fathers of the painter colony Nymindegabmalerne. In the summer months the painters rented rooms at the Nymindegab Inn, where they sketched drawings/drafts for paintings, which were finished when they returned to Copenhagen for the winter. Some of Tuxens paintings can be seen at Nymindegab Museum.

Vestjyllands Kunstmuseum (Janus Bygningen) – The Art Museum of western Jutland (The Janus Building) in Tistrup, between Varde and Ølgod, is home to a collection of 2000 works, primarily contemporary art and varying temporary exhibitions.

=== Varde classicism ===
As Varde has burned several times many of the buildings were built in the late 18th century and in the beginning of the 19th century. Among these we find Sillasens Hus (Sillasens house) adjacent to the town square and the Kampmannske Gaard (Kampmannske estate). The Danish classicism dictated that house walls were to be plastered, but this was not done in Varde, as a breakthrough in the mass production of bricks and tiles had been made at the time. Instead details were more prominently highlighted, which resulted in red walls, red tiles and an abundance of details.

== Businesses and Industry ==
The Businesses and Industries in Varde can somewhat be divided into 5 pillars, where 4 categories according to Kontur 2014 is above the national average. These are the production of food products/agriculture, furniture/clothing, tourism and construction/housing.

=== Larger businesses ===
Among the larger businesses in the municipality of Varde we find Nobia, owner of e.g. the kitchen brands HTH and Invita with about 2000 employees in Denmark. BoConcept, furniture and accessories business. The Danish part of BoConcepts production is located in Ølgod. Fibervisions, global leader in the area of bicomponent fibers, used in everything from tea bags to fibreboards. Titan Europe, producer of turbine towers, subcontractor to Titan Wind Energy.

=== Tourism ===
Varde is one of the largest tourism municipalities in Denmark, which also means that it encompasses a few/several larger tourism related businesses. Within this category we find Hvidbjerg Strand Feriepark (Blåvand Badeland), number 42 on the most visited attraction list of 2013 from VisitDenmark, the cottage rental agencies, Dayz Seawest in Nymindegab and businesses who supplement these and cater to tourists visiting the area.

=== Gastronomy ===
Following the business development project Naturen til bords a community of interests was formed named Sydvestjyske Smagsoplevelser – Taste experiences of South-western Jutland(roughly translated) to carry forward and promote the project after release of the cooking book Naturen til bords.

=== Danish army ===
The Danish army has 3 garrisons in the municipality of Varde, specifically Varde, Oksbøl and Nymindegab. Following the "Military/Defense- settlement of 2013" the Hærens Sergeantskole moved from Sønderborg to the barracks in Varde, which means that Hærens Sergentskole and Efterretningsregimentet is located in Varde and Danske Artilleriregiment are at home in the town of Oksbøl in municipality of Varde. In addition to this the Hjemmeværnsskolen is located in Nymindegab.

== Tourism ==
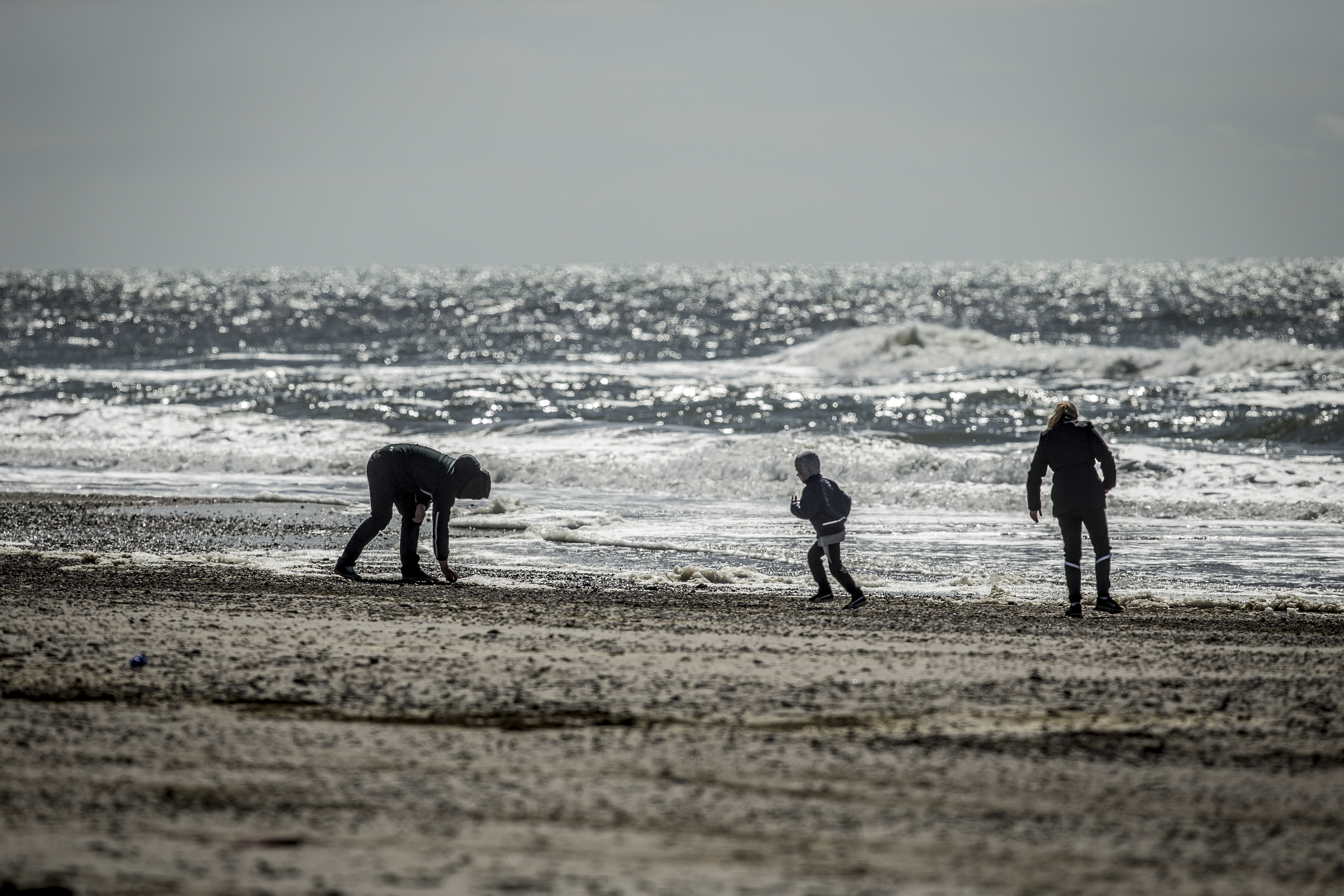
OTB in Varde

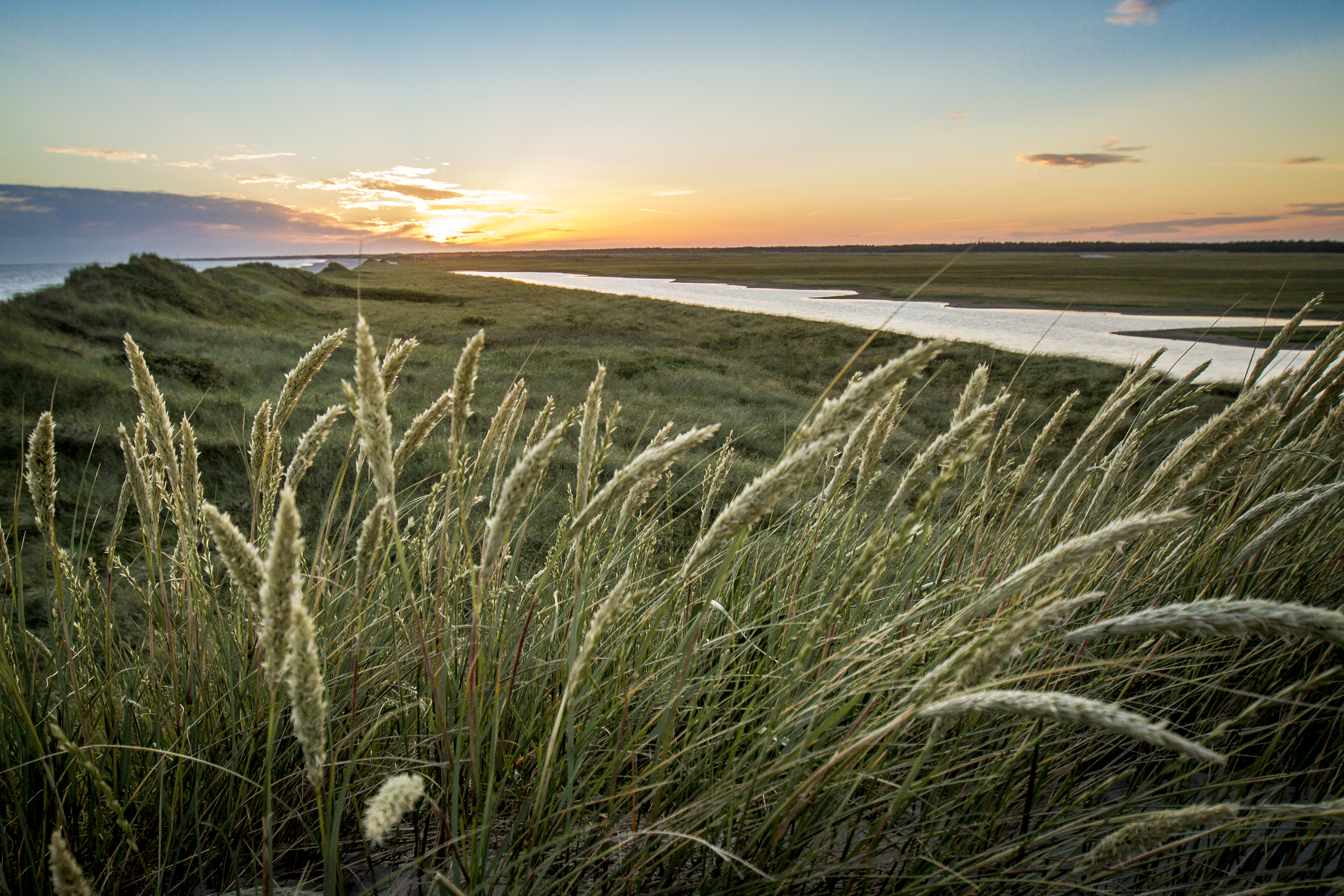
Sunset in coastal region of Varde(kommune)

With a long and broad high quality beach stretching from Skallingen in the south to Nymindegab in the north and with its characteristic look, the coastal area of Varde in the beginning primarily attracted artists, who found inspiration in the landscape and thereby were among the first, together with the bourgeoisie, to initiate the building of cottages for recreational purposes along the coast of Varde. In Denmark in the 1920s the common worker was awarded 2 weeks of vacation, which put the building of cottages along the coast in motion and made the Tourism industry in Varde what it is today. A target destination could have been the Henne Mølleå Badehotel (seaside hotel), designed by Poul Henningsen in 1935.

Varde municipality is the largest coastal tourism municipality in Denmark and especially attracts tourists to the coastal destinations of Blåvand, Vejers Strand and Henne Strand. The tourists who stay in Varde Municipality primarily stay in seaside cottages and among these tourists the German segment is by far the biggest, although there has also been reported a rise in the number of guests from Norway and the Danes themselves.

== Transport and Infrastructure ==
=== Automobile ===
Most traffic from and to Varde goes via primary route 11, which starts in Tønder, and goes via Varde all the way to Aalborg in northern Jutland. Primary route 11 crosses the E20 (the Esbjerg highway) near Korskro, from where there is approximately 10 kilometres (6.2 mi) to Varde via primary route 11.

=== Train ===
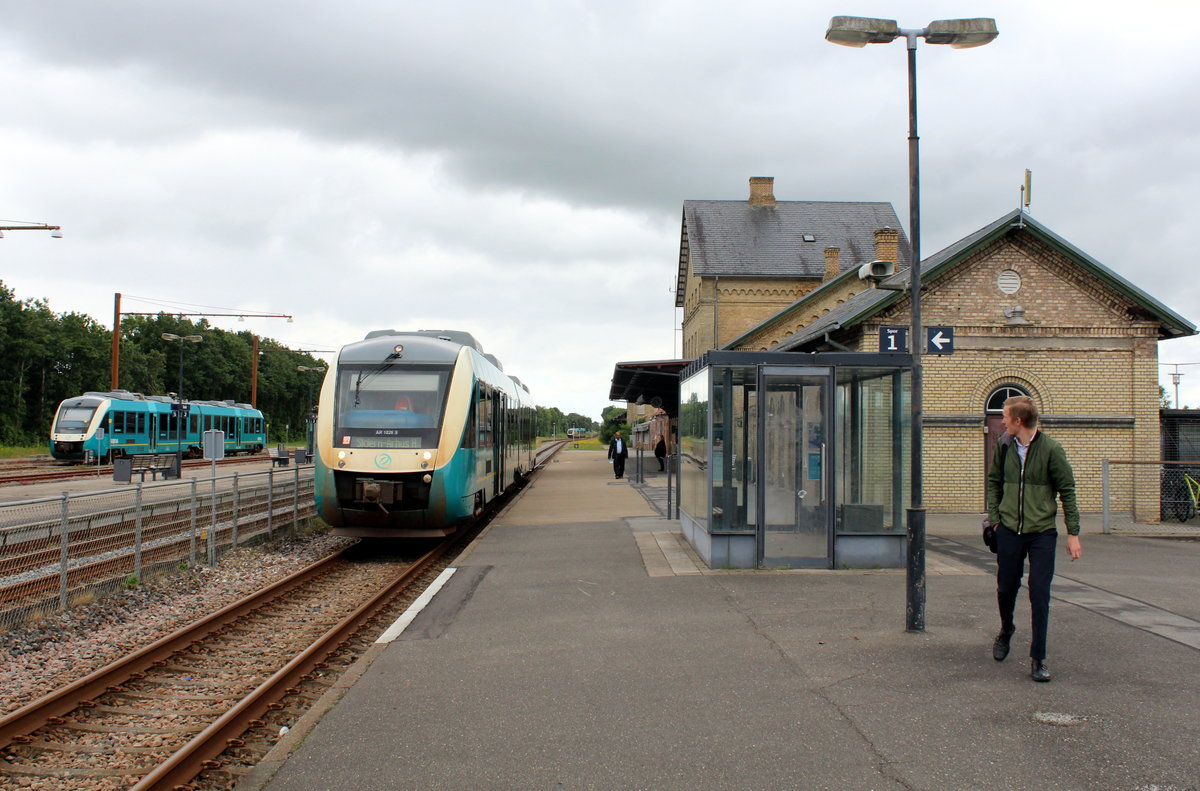
Varde railway station in 2020.

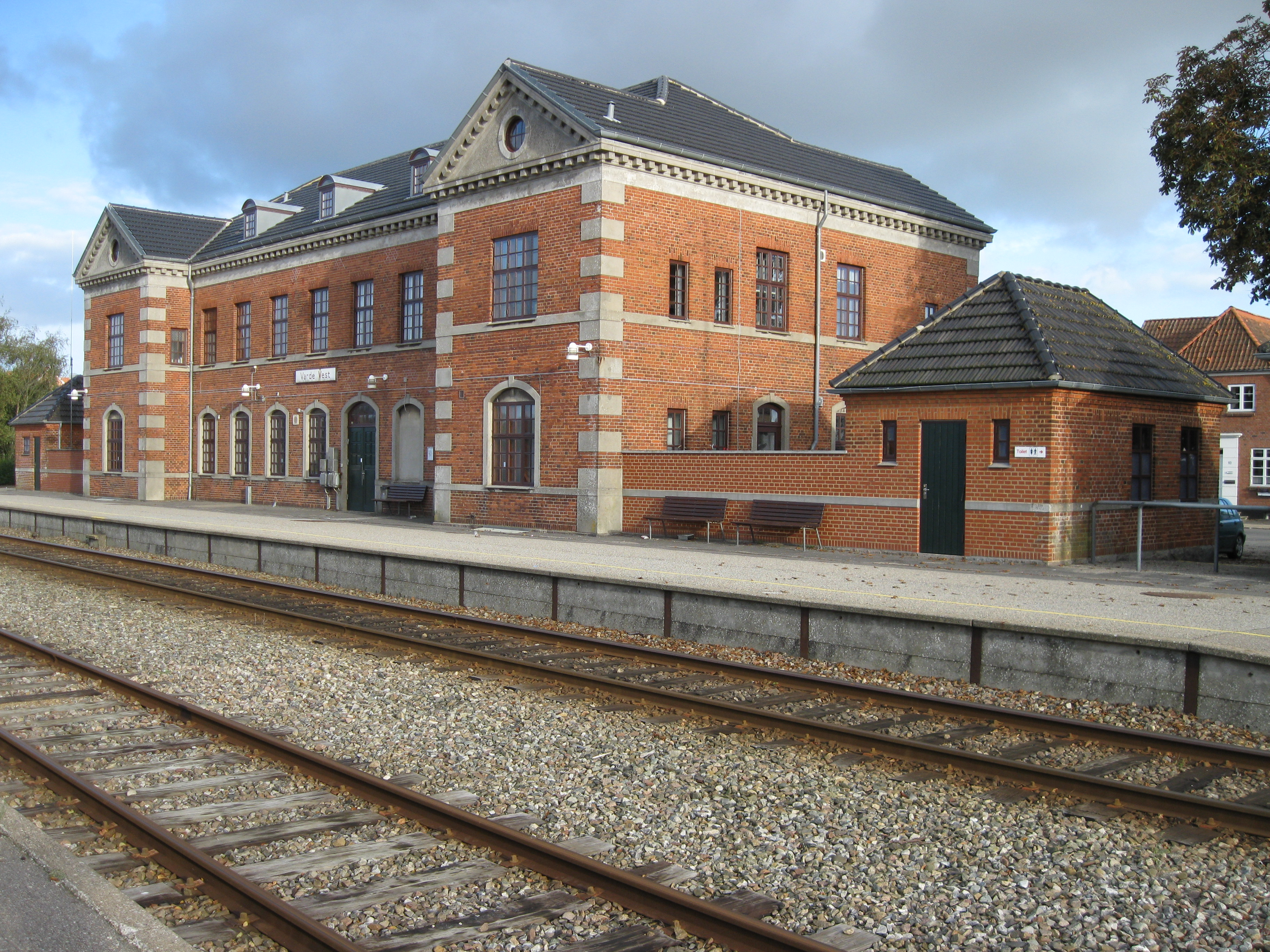
Varde Vest railway station in 2010.

Varde is located on the Esbjerg–Struer railway line and it is possible to reach Varde by train via Esbjerg or Skjern. It is also served by the Varde–Nørre Nebel railway line ("Vestbanen") which connects Varde with Oksbøl in the western and Nørre Nebel in the north-western part of the municipality.

Varde has 6 railway stations: Varde, Varde Vest, Varde Nord, Frisvadvej, Varde Kaserne and Boulevarden, which makes it the city in West Jutland with the most railway stations, despite its population.

List of stations in Varde with departures and departing passengers
	Station	Departing Passengers	Departures	Largest relation
1	Varde	130,155	19,601	Esbjerg
2	Varde Vest	19,448	8,725	
3	Varde Nord	18,813	10,764	Ølgod
4	Varde Kaserne	15,724	19,983	Esbjerg
5	Frisvadvej	16,210	8,725	
6	Boulevarden	4,960	8,725	

=== Bicycle ===
In recent years the municipality of Varde has widened/expanded its net of bicycle roads significantly, in large degree through the goodwill of citizens and landowners, whereby the municipality has been able to build 20 kilometres (12 mi) of bicycle road between Varde and Nørre Nebel and about 10 kilometres (6.2 mi) between Varde and Næsbjerg. This means that you´re now able to reach almost all corners of Varde by bike as there was already about 25 kilometres (16 mi) of bicycle road between Varde and Blåvand via Oksbøl and approximately 20 km of bicycle road between Varde and Esbjerg.

=== Hiking ===
If you enjoy hiking, the North Sea Trail goes through the municipality of Varde, the bicoastal "kyst til kyst stien" goes from Blåvand in the west to Vejle in the east and along with these a variety of local hiking trails.

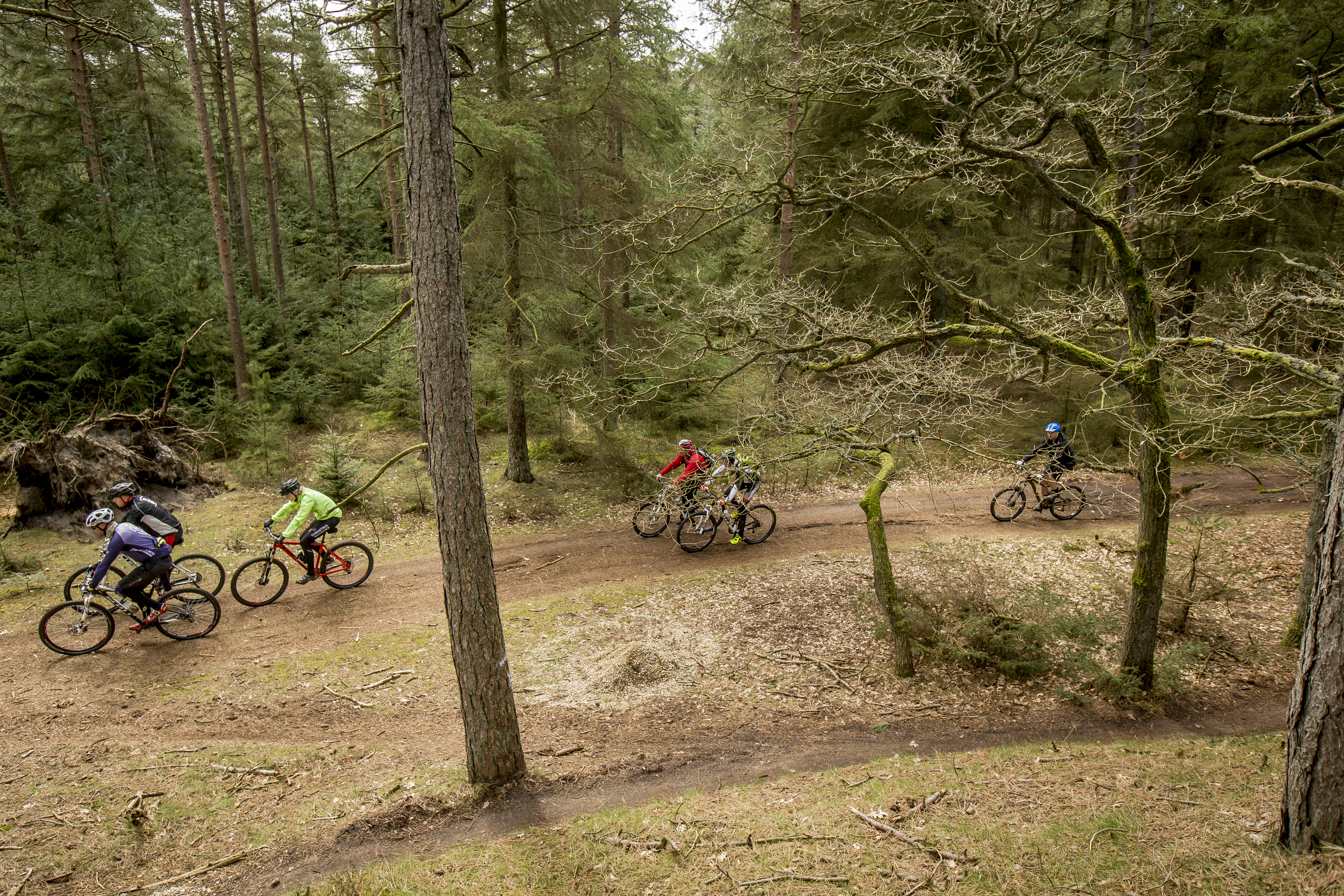
Mountainbiking in Varde

== Sports ==
Speedway is generally a sport that is more prominent in the municipality of Varde, than in most other Danish municipalities.

Furthermore, the nature in and around Varde favours outdoor sports like cycling, mountainbiking, beach related sports, fishing, golf, Muay Thai, hunting, and skydiving at Varde Faldskærmsklub.

== Festivals and annual events ==
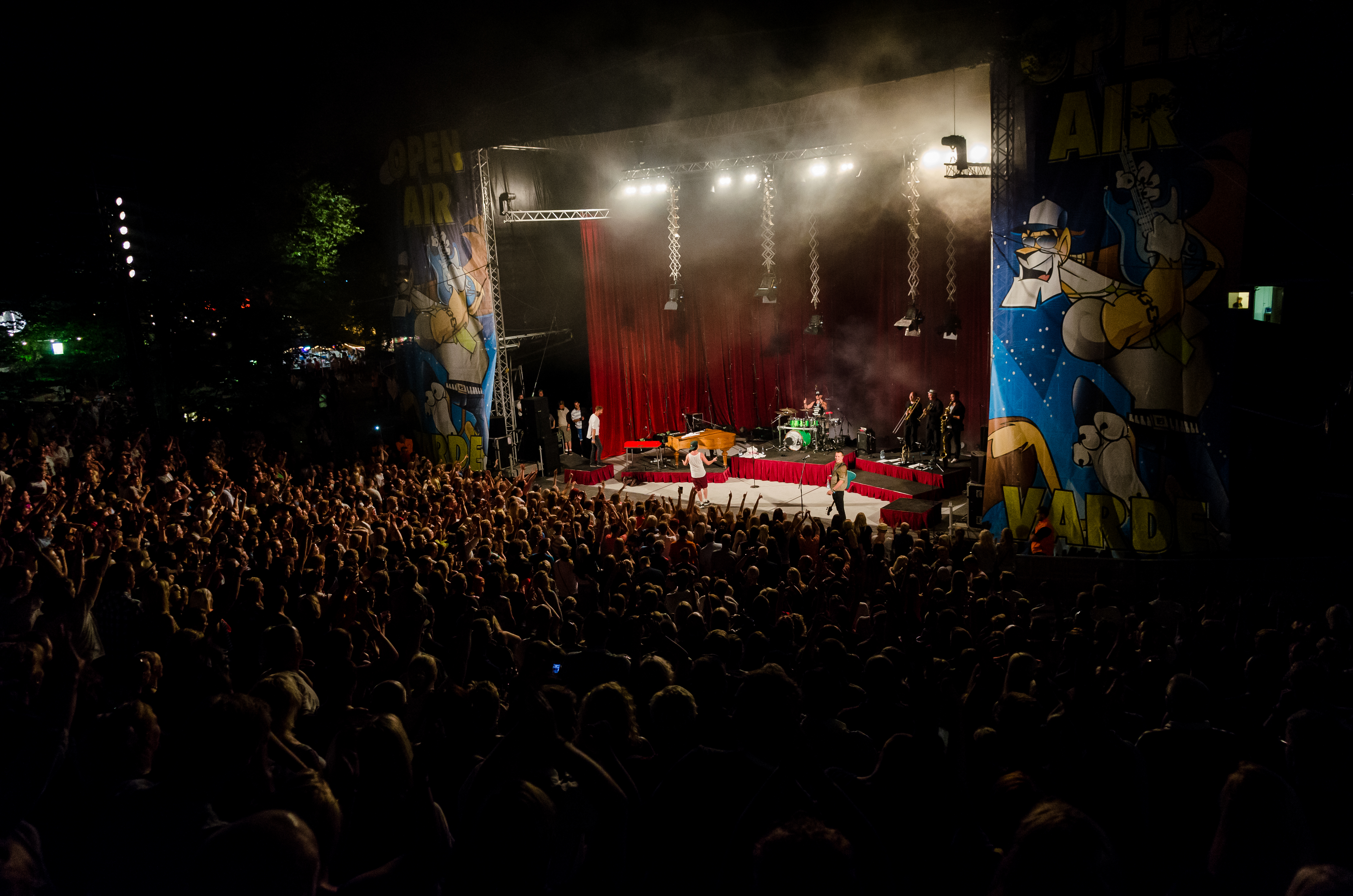
Varde Open Air

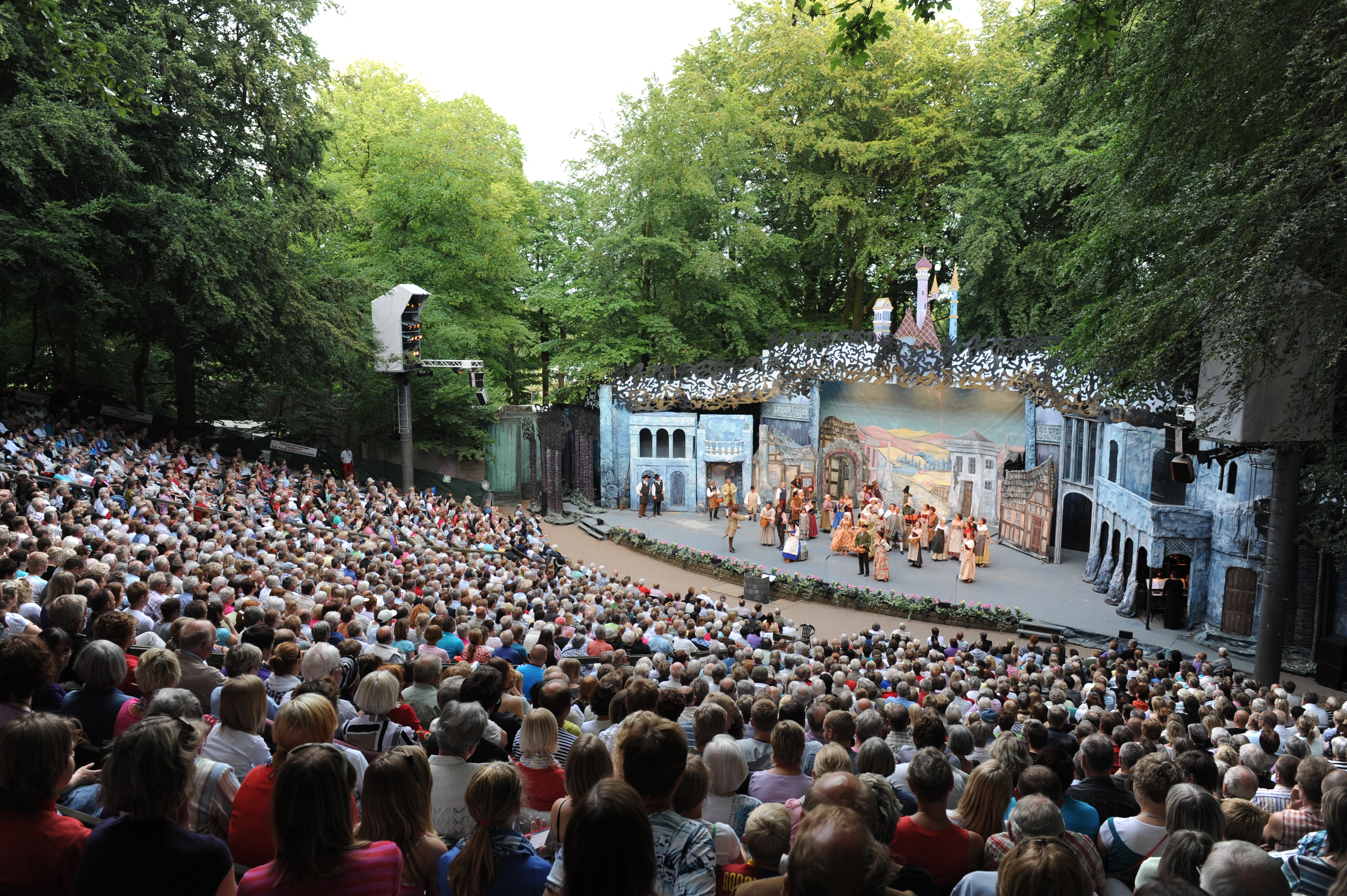
Varde Sommerspil

- Varde Open Air – Music festival
- Varde Sommerspil – Musical taking place in July
- Day of the forest, lake, sea and stream/river
- Red deer festival in Vejers
- The amber festival
- The lamb festival
- The Wadden Sea festival
- The sheep market in Ho
- The elf/goblin triathlon
- Eventcalendar

== Notable people ==
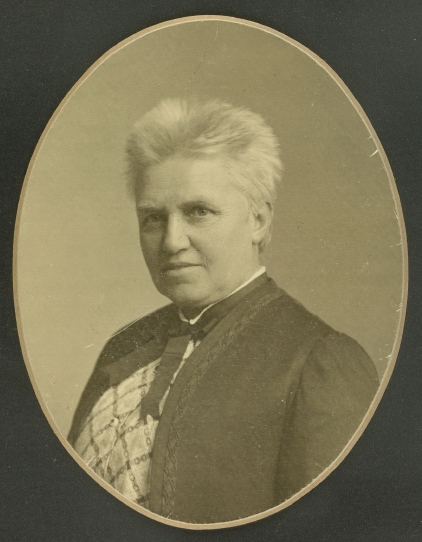
Marie Luplau, 1910

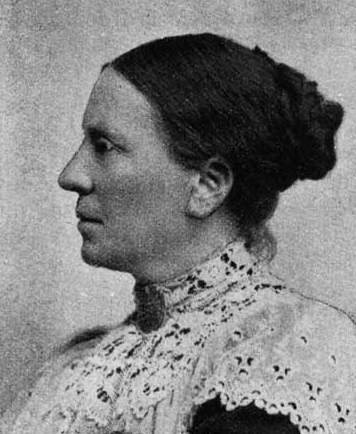
Anne Bruun, 1909

- Ludvig Verner Helms (1825 in Varde – 1918) a trader with Borneo Company Limited in Sarawak
- Marie Luplau (1848 in Varde – 1925) an artist and educator, active in the women's movement
- Anne Bruun (1853 in Varde – 1934) a Danish schoolteacher and women's rights activist
- Johanne Hesbeck (1873 in Varde – 1927) a photographer, ran a portrait studio in Holte 1915–1927
- Peder Oluf Pedersen (1874 in Sig near Varde – 1941) a Danish engineer and physicist
- Johannes Nicolaus Brønsted (1879 in Varde – 1947) a Danish physical chemist
- Maren Sørensen (1882 in Varde – 1957) the first female Danish priest, also a nurse
- Hans Christian Adamson (1890–1968) a Danish-born American writer, who survived adrift for 24 days in the Pacific Ocean in 1942.
- Henning Karmark (1907 in Varde – 1989) a Danish film producer
- Otto Frello (1924 in Ovtrup, near Varde – 2015) a painter, graphic artist, cartoonist and illustrator

=== Sport ===
- John Nielsen (born 1956 in Varde) a former racing driver, won the 24 Hours of Le Mans in 1990
- Uiloq Slettemark (born 1965 in Varde) a Greenlandic biathlete
- Jakob Poulsen (born 1983 in Varde) a professional footballer now football manager , 450 club caps
- Jesper Jørgensen (born 1984 in Varde) a Danish professional footballer, 370 club caps

== Sister cities ==
Varde has a single sister city, as designated by the Sister Cities International, Inc.:

- (United States) San Mateo, California, US (since 17 November 1969)

== Gallery ==
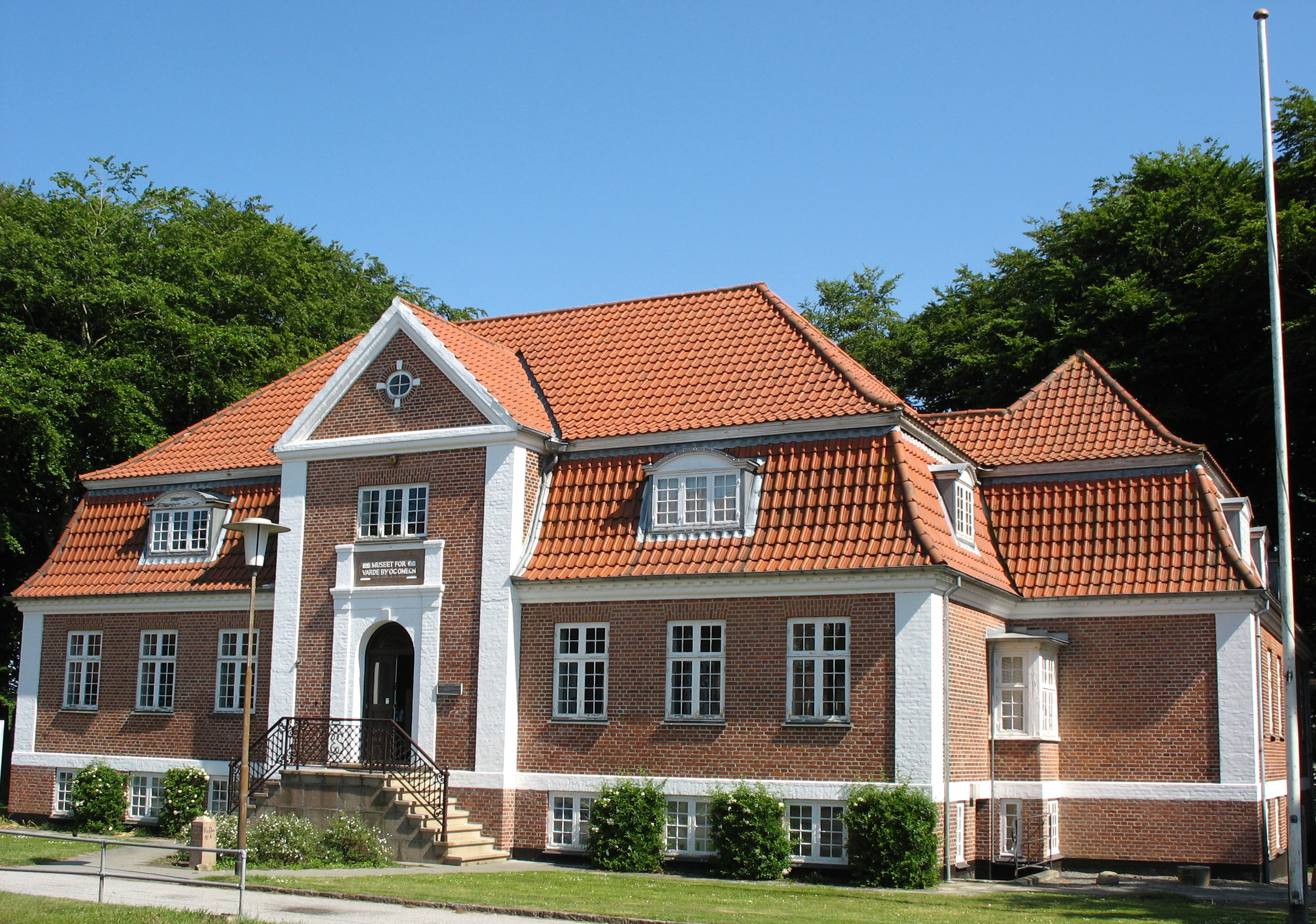
Varde Museum

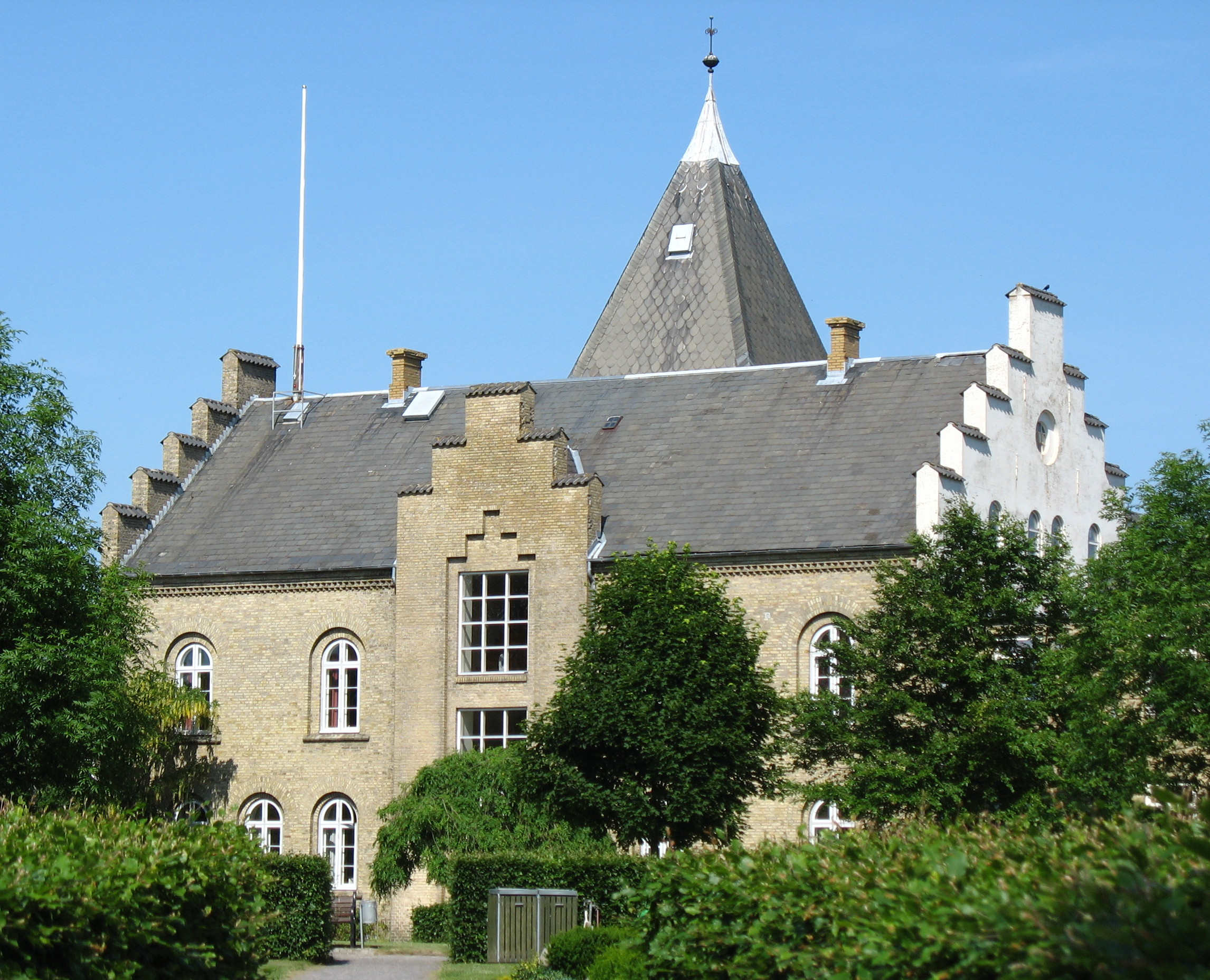
The old City Hall

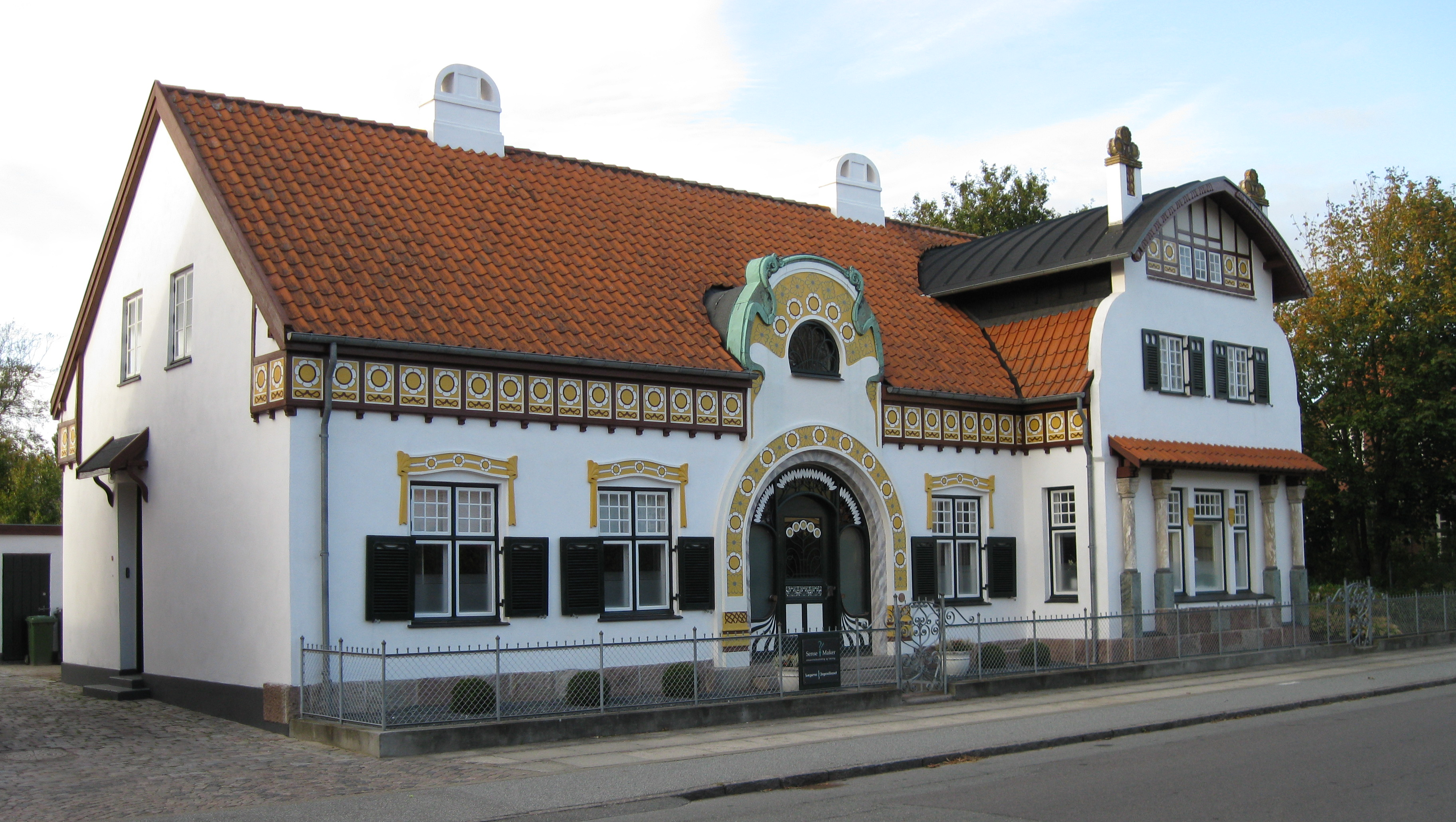
Jugendhuset – The Art Nouveau House

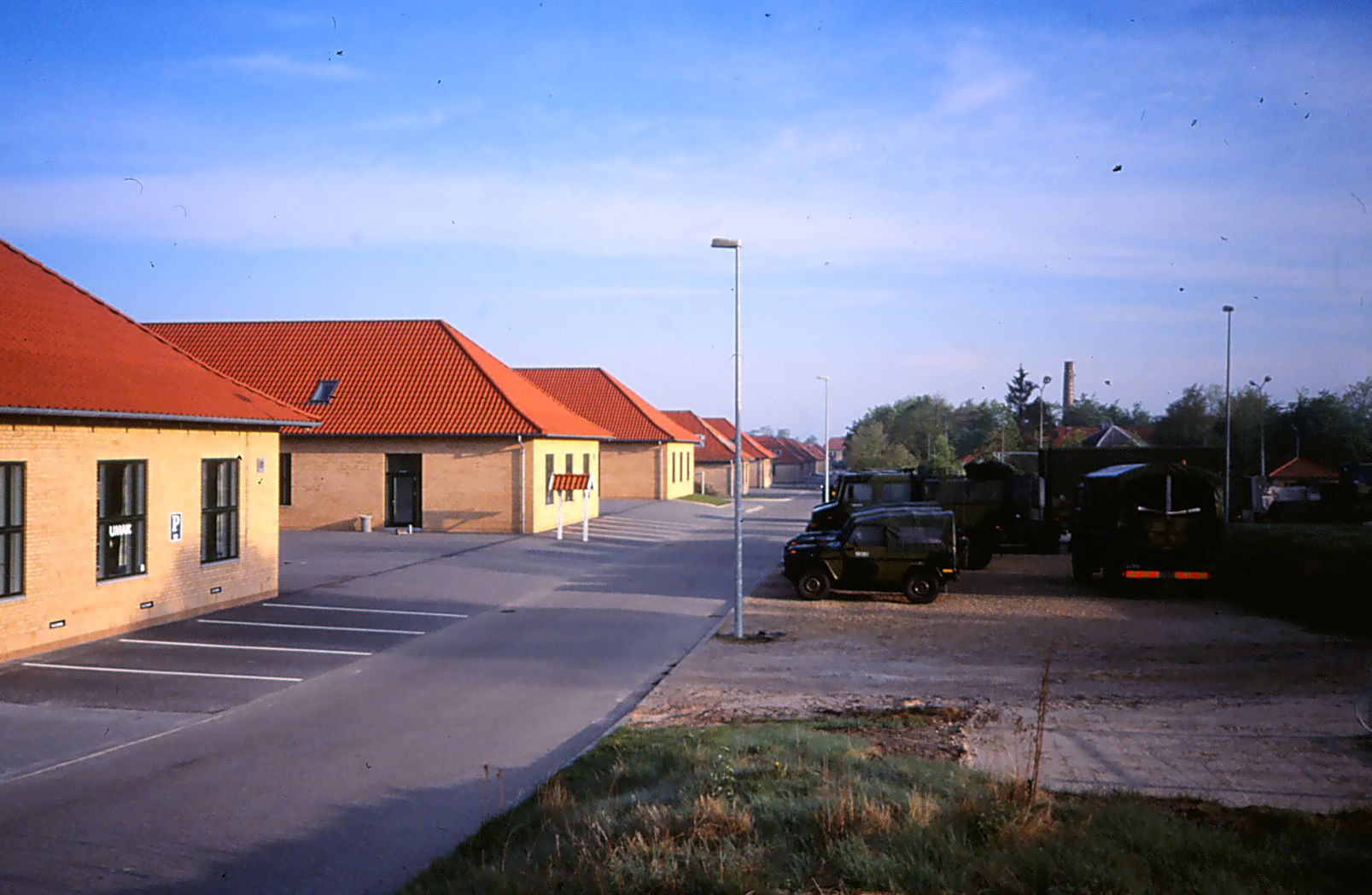
Varde Barracks

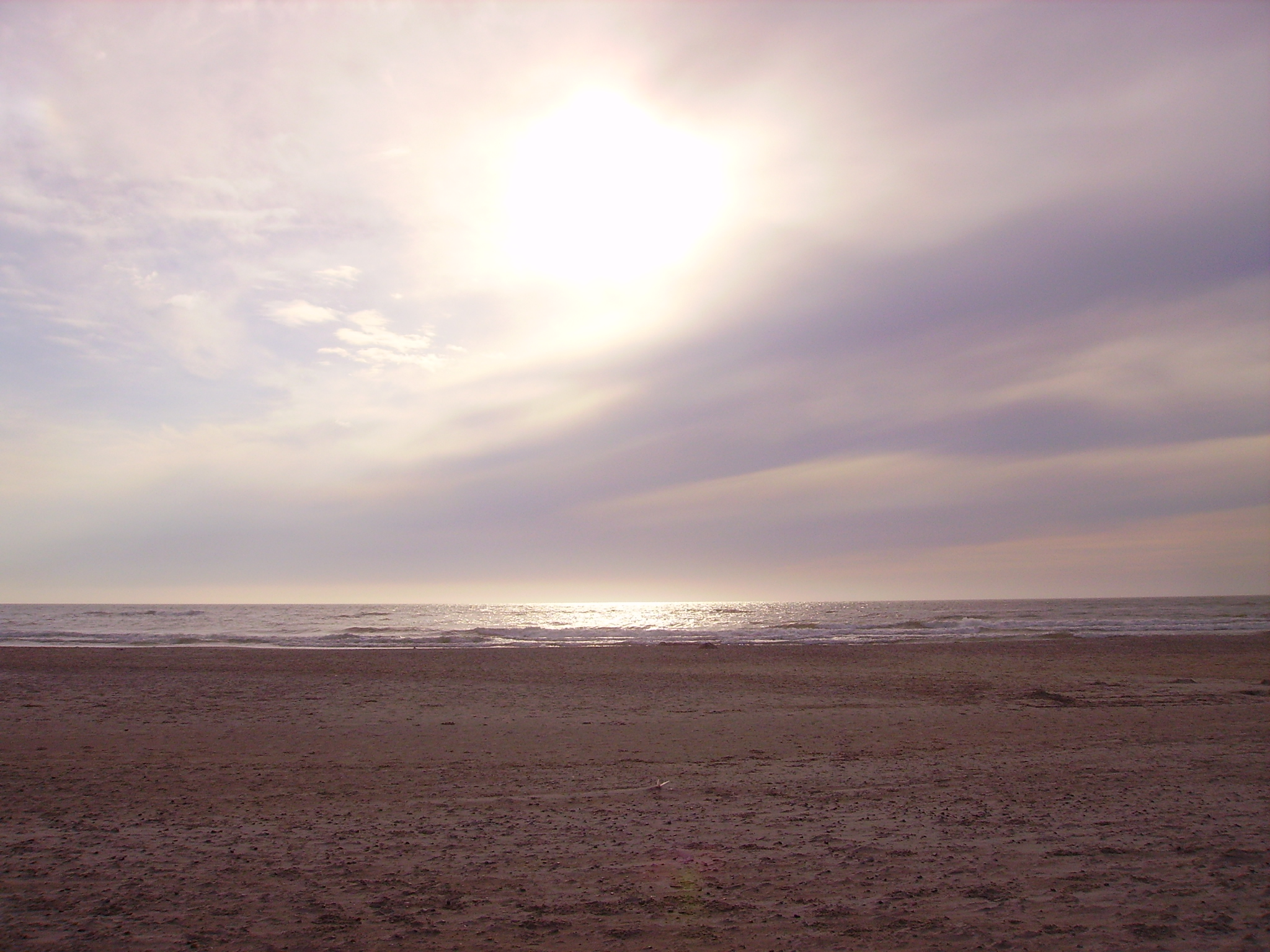
Henne Strand

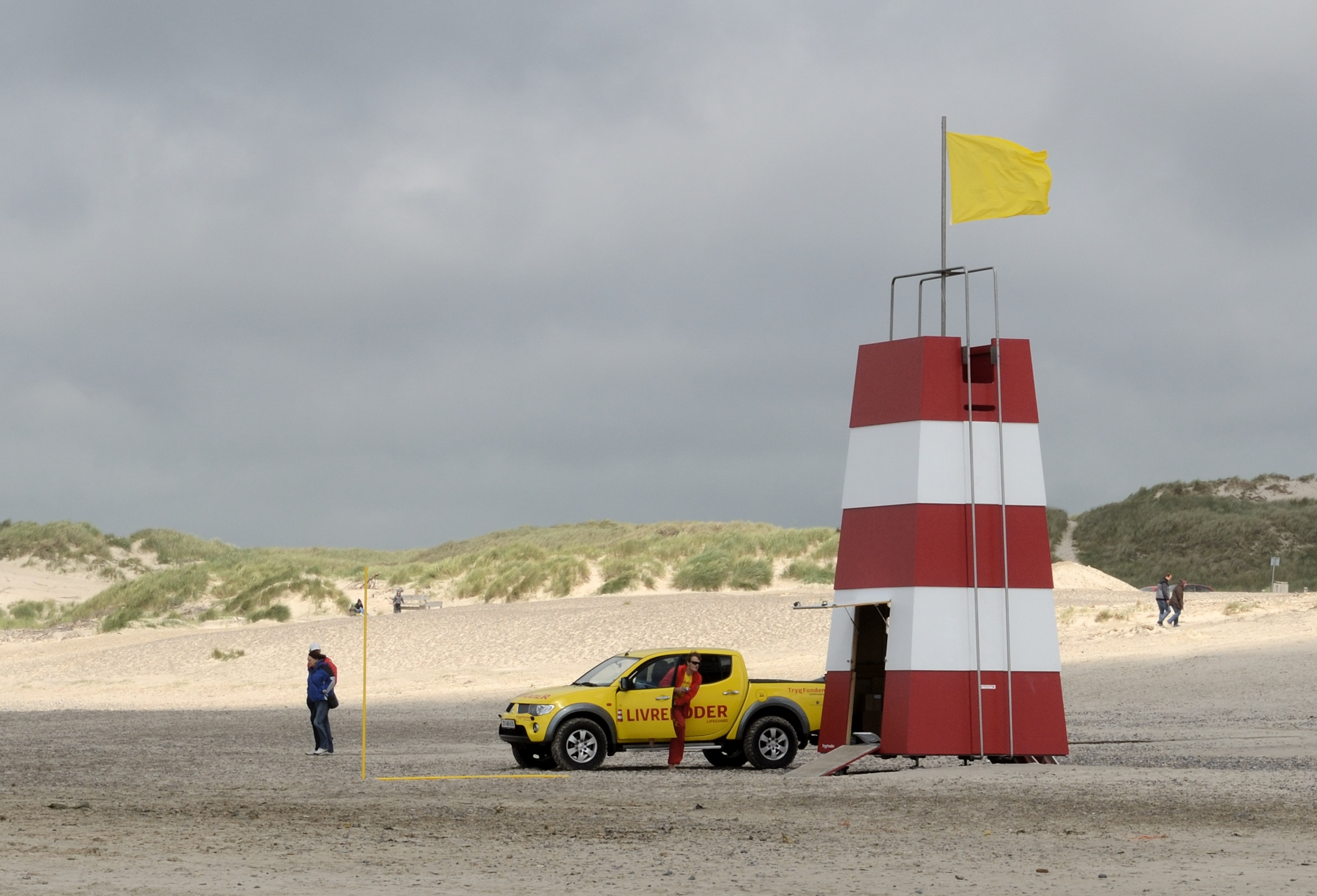
Henne Strand

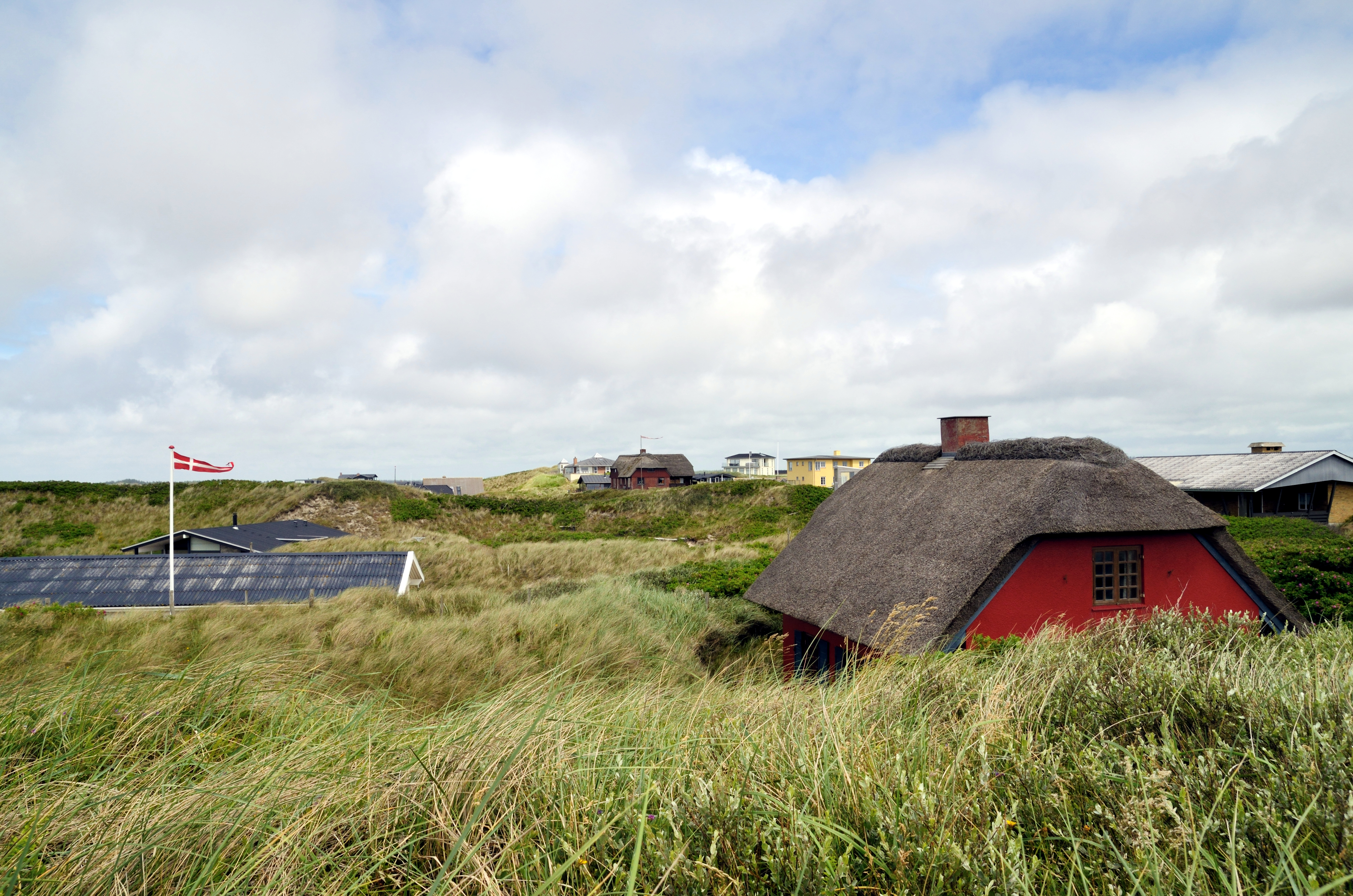
Cottages at Henne Strand

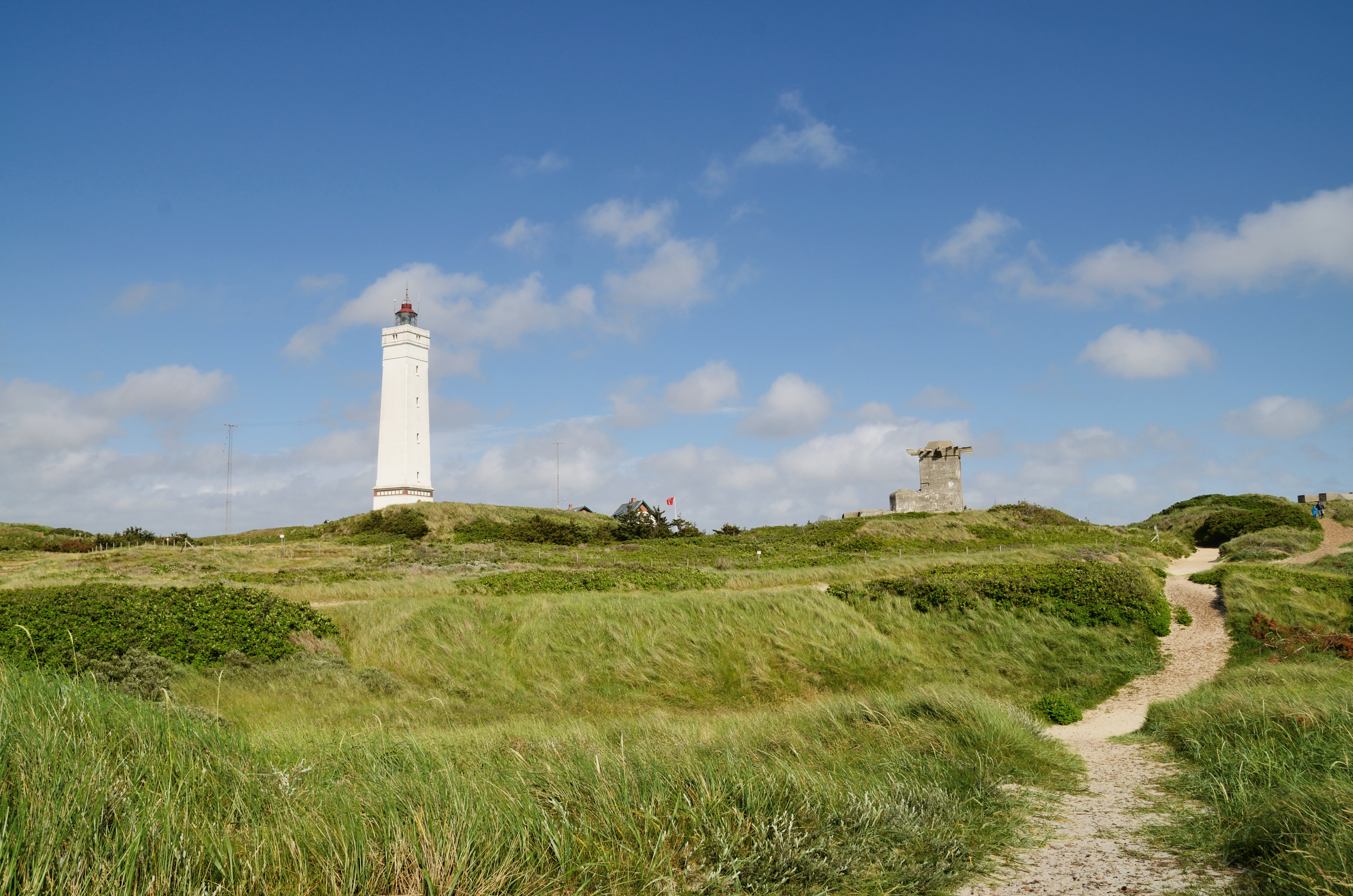
Blåvandshuk lighthouse and part of the atlantic wall
