= Blåvandshuk =

Westernmost point of Denmark

Coordinates: 55°33′28″N 8°05′00″E

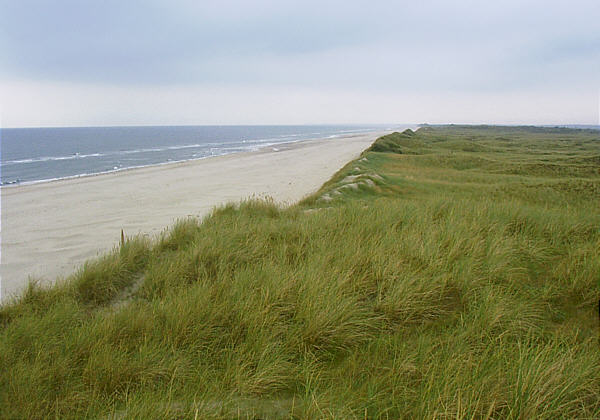

Blåvandshuk is a headland on the North Sea coast of Jutland northwest of Esbjerg, and is the westernmost point of metropolitan Denmark. The Blåvand Lighthouse is the westernmost located building in Denmark.

== Natural Environment ==
A significant portion of Blåvandshuk is marsh land, moor, dunes, and beaches.

Because Blåvandshuk is on the coast and has a peninsula (Skallingen) which stretches to the southeast, it is surrounded by much water. To the northwest is the North Sea. To the southeast of Skallingen is Fanø Bay (Fanø Bugt) and the island Fanø. Beyond Fanø Bay is the Wadden Sea. To the northeast of Skallingen lies Ho Bay (Ho Bugt) and the small island of Langli.

Skallingen and the waters off its coast are protected, a part of the Wadden Sea wildlife reserve and protection area being discussed as a potential national park.

== Administrative status ==
Prior to January 1, 2007, Blåvandshuk was also the name of a municipality (Danish, kommune) that contained the headland. The municipality covered an area of 223 km^{2}, and had a total population of 4,378 (2005). Its last mayor was Hans Chr. Thoning, a member of the Venstre (Liberal Party) political party. The main town and site of its municipal council was the town of Oksbøl. Blåvandshuk municipality ceased to exist due to Kommunalreformen ("The Municipal Reform" of 2007). It was merged with former Blaabjerg, Helle, Varde, and Ølgod municipalities to form the new Varde municipality.

Owing to its westerly position "Blåvand" for many years was home to an important coast radio station (from 1914) and later satellite radio hubs, including the Inmarsat station "Blaavand-Atlantic-East". In 1996 the radio station became remotely controlled from Lyngby Radio and finally closed down entirely in 2019. The radio station was of great importance to those employed in North Sea fishery, and the message "Blåvand melder storm" (en: "Blaavand storm warning") was a particularly dreaded message, so much that a film was made with this title (Blaavand melder storm) in 1938.

== Mines ==
Located on Skallingen's southwestern coast was Denmark's last minefield, left over from Second World War, when 1,389,289 landmines were placed in Denmark by the German occupation forces as part of their defence line. A 1.86 km^{2} closed-off area on the peninsula still contained mines sixty years after the war. Demining efforts were hampered by the shifting sands that can bury mines several meters underground, and the drift of the sea which has moved the beach some 200 meters to the east since the end of the war. In accordance with the Ottawa Convention and Article 5 of the Mine Ban Treaty most of the minefield was cleared in 2006–2008 by the Ministry of Transport and the Danish Coastal Authority, and the last, most difficult section in 2012. Some 3,098 antipersonnel mines, 259 antivehicle mines, and 554 unexploded ordnance were collected and destroyed.
