= Anne Bruun =

Danish schoolteacher and women's rights activist

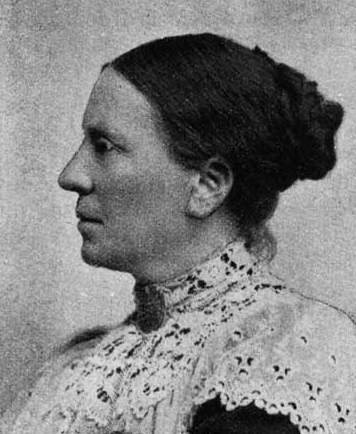
Anne Bruun

Anne Kirstine Bruun (1853–1934) was a Danish schoolteacher and women's rights activist. An early proponent of equal pay for male and female teachers, in 1900 she became the first woman to serve on the central committee of the Danish Union of Teachers. She was an enthusiastic member of the Danish Women's Society and a frequent contributor to their magazine Kvinden og Samfundet which she edited for a time in the mid-1890s. Bruun was an early supporter of the Women's Society's direct involvement in the fight for women's voting rights.

== Early life ==
Born on 14 February 1853 in Varde, Anne Kirstine Bruun was the daughter of Hans Christian Bruun (1819–1879), a tailor, and Kirstine Dorthea Terpager (1811–1872). While working as a housemaid for an elderly lady in Varde, she became acquainted with opportunities for women to become teachers after coming across the journal Blade fra danske Kvinder and articles by Natalie Zahle in the newspaper Fædrelandet. Despite her parents' objections, she passed Beyer, Bohr og Femmer's examination for women teachers when she was 21. She then attended Ludvig Trier's course in lecturing.

A practising Christian, she was inspired by Rudolph Frimodt (1828–1879) who headed Copenhagen's Inner Mission. In 1875, she became an assistant in the newly established parish mission in the Nørrebro district of Copenhagen, conducting children's services in St. Stephen's Church.

== Career ==
=== Teaching ===
In 1874, Bruun was employed by the Municipal School Authority for Copenhagen and Frederiksberg, teaching mainly in Copenhagen school and completing her career at Sundholm Skole. In 1896, she was a key founding member of Fonden for trængende Lærerbørns Uddannelse (Foundation for the Education of the Needy Children of Teachers). From 1900 to 1915, she served on Danmarks Lærerforenings hovedbestyrelse (Danish Teachers' Association's Central Management Board) where she was the first female management representative. She contributed in particular to a new curriculum for the authority's schools.

=== Women's rights ===
In 1889, Bruun became one of the first advocates of equal pay for men and women, contributing to work on new legislation which in 1908 established the starting salaries of women teachers at a level comparable to those for men.

Bruun was also an active member of the Danish Women's Society and of Foreningen imod Lovbeskyttelse for Usædelighed (FLU), an organization which fought against public prostitution (the Regulation system). In 1886, she became a member of FLU's management committee and in 1898, was appointed to its board of directors. She was the organization's most talented speaker, openly supporting its cause. When legislation was passed against public prostitution, FLU was dissolved in 1907. Bruun then became a co-founding member of Vagten mod Offentlig Prostitution (Guard against Public Prostitution). She also fought against sex-trafficking, serving on the Danish branch of the Committee for the Suppression of the While Slave Trade.

In 1889, Bruun became a board member of the central Women's Society, heading the organization in 1890 during the sickness of its chair, Kirstine Frederiksen. From 1895 to 1897, she edited the Society's journal Kvinden og Samfindet, frequently contributing article both before and after. In 1899, Bruun was elected chair of the Society's Copenhagen branch. In 1907, she succeeded in having women admitted to the Technical Society's School.

For some time, Bruun had been a proponent of women's suffrage, despite the official stand of the Women's Society. As the position evolved, she became a member of the Society's electoral committee in 1904 and joined the Kristne Kvinders Vælgerforening (Christian Women Voters Association). In 1924, she was recognized as an honorary member of the Women's Society's Copenhagen branch.

Anne Bruun died in Kalundborg on 11 July 1934.
