= Vejers Strand =

- Town
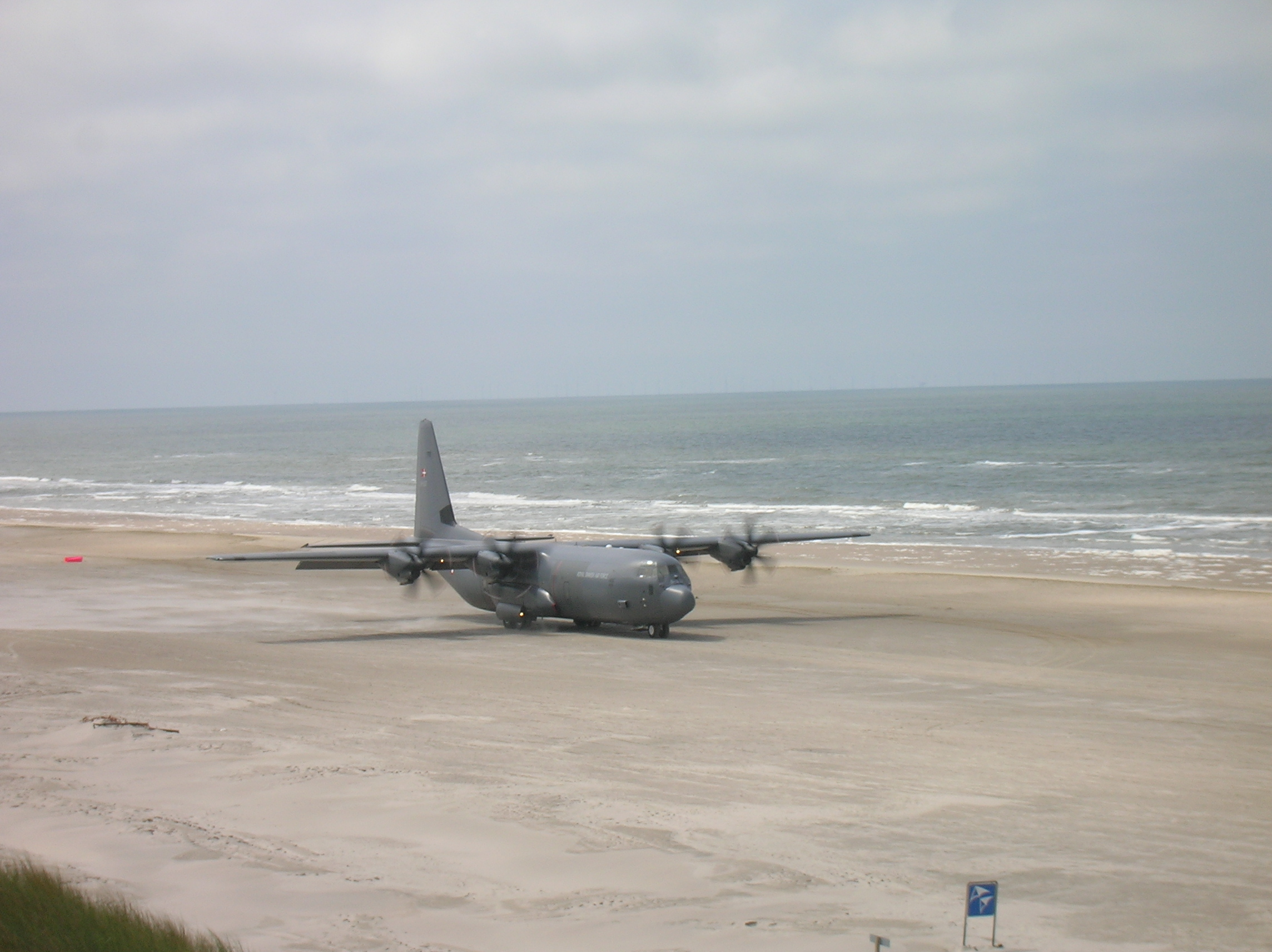
- A C-130 Hercules in Vejers Strand

- Location in Denmark
- Coordinates: 55°37′25″N 8°07′52″E
- Country: Denmark
- Region: Southern Denmark (Syddanmark)
- Municipality: Varde

Population (2013)
  - Total: 27
- Time zone: UTC+1 (CET)
  - Summer (DST): UTC+2 (CEST)
- Postal code: 6853
- Website: vejers.com

Vejers Strand is a small Danish town with only 27 inhabitants, but a multitude of holiday homes. Vejers Strand is situated in the former Ribe Amt, and is part of the Syddanmark region as of 2007, roughly 30 km northern of the town of Esbjerg and between the villages of Blåvand and Grærup on the west coast of Jutland. The nearest town is Varde at a distance of about 20 km.

The village can be divided into the main area Vejers and the bigger area of Vejers Strand (Vejers Beach), a holiday resort. Vejers Strand has 22 registered residents and over 500 holiday homes of various categories. The almost uninhabited town Vejers is situated alongside the military base of Kallesmærsk Hede to the south and east. The abandoned houses are used as military training facilities.

Vejers Strand is known for its sweet factory. During good visibility you can recognize both of the 20 and 35 square kilometers-sized offshore wind parks Horns Rev 1 and 2. The long, broad beach is very popular with surfers, sailors and swimmers as well as riders. Occasionally, Hercules military transport planes make training flights onto and from the beach, closed for the purpose.
