= Blåvand Lighthouse =

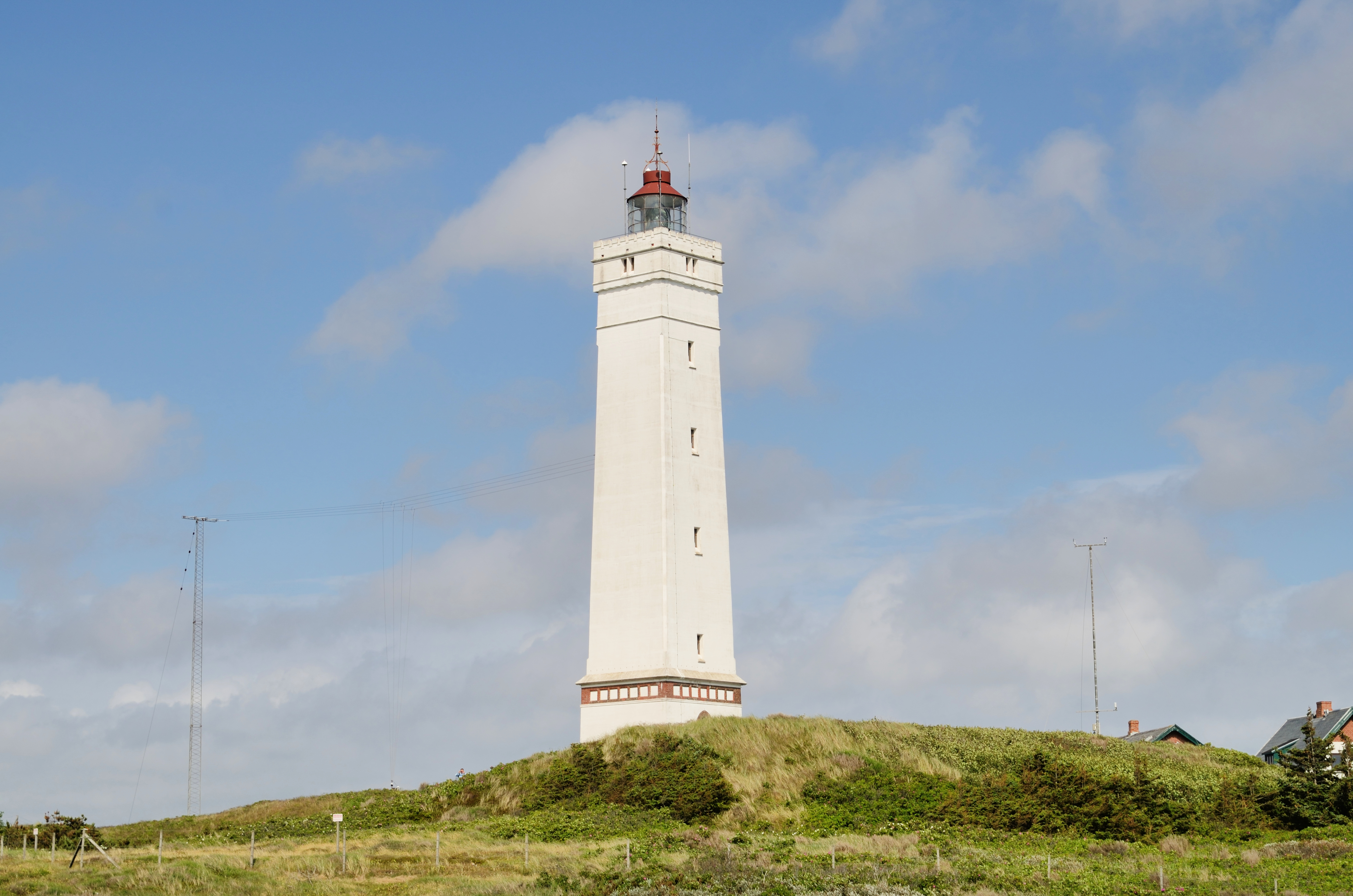
- Blåvand Lighthouse, Esbjerg
- Location: Blåvandshuk
- Coordinates: 55°33′28″N 8°05′00″E

Tower
- Constructed: 1900
- Construction: concrete
- Height: 39 metres (128 ft)
- Shape: square tower with balcony and lantern
- Markings: white tower and red lantern
- Heritage: monument on Kulturstyrelsen register

Light
- Focal height: 55 metres (180 ft)
- Lens: 2nd order Fresnel lens
- Range: 23 nmi (43 km; 26 mi)
- Characteristic: Fl (3) W 20s
- Denmark no.: DFL-0150

Blåvand Lighthouse (Danish: Blåvand Fyr) is a seacoast lighthouse in Blåvandshuk near Esbjerg, Denmark. Built in 1900 to replace an older light, the lighthouse lies on Blåvandshuk, the westernmost point in Denmark, making Blåvand Lighthouse the country's westernmost building.

The lighthouse is 39 metres (128 ft) tall with a focal plane height (height of the light above sea level) of 55 metres (180 ft). The light can be seen up to 20 nautical miles (37 km; 23 mi) out at sea and flashes three times every 20 seconds. The lighthouse has a square floor plan constructed on a granite plinth with brick walls, which are whitewashed in modern day. Access to the battlemented rooftop is by a winding staircase ascending through a small trapdoor.

== See also ==
- List of lighthouses and lightvessels in Denmark

== Gallery ==
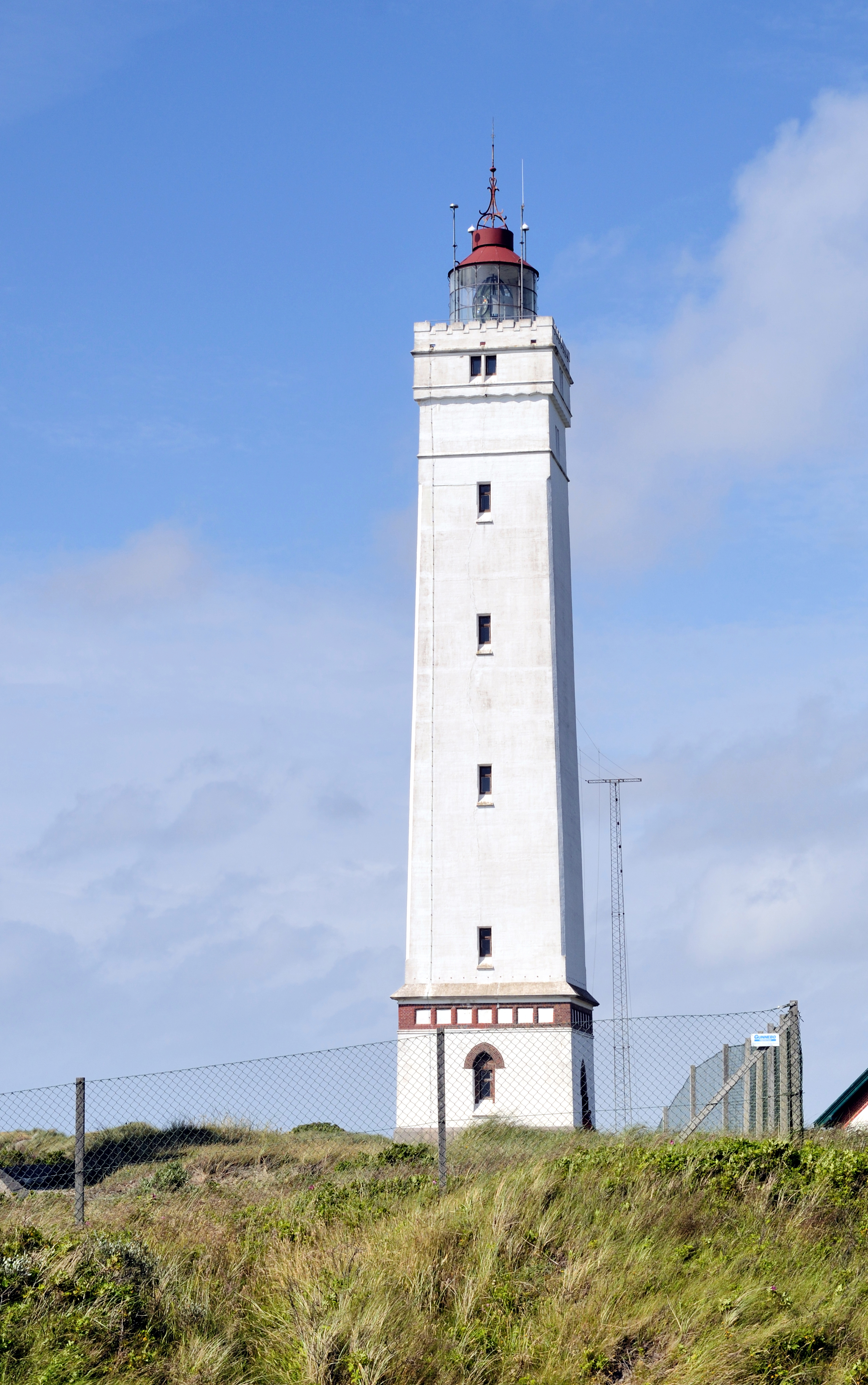
1

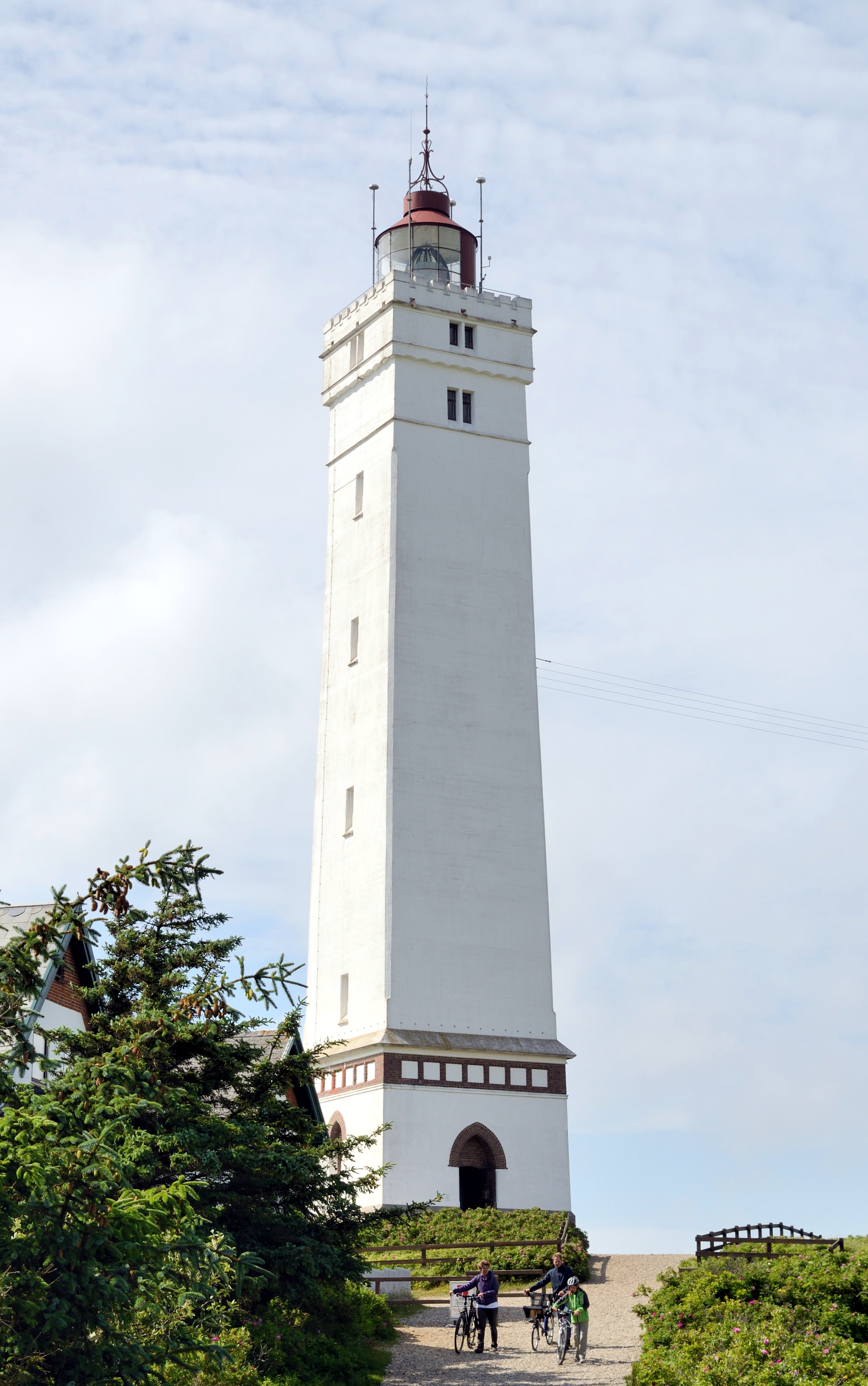
2

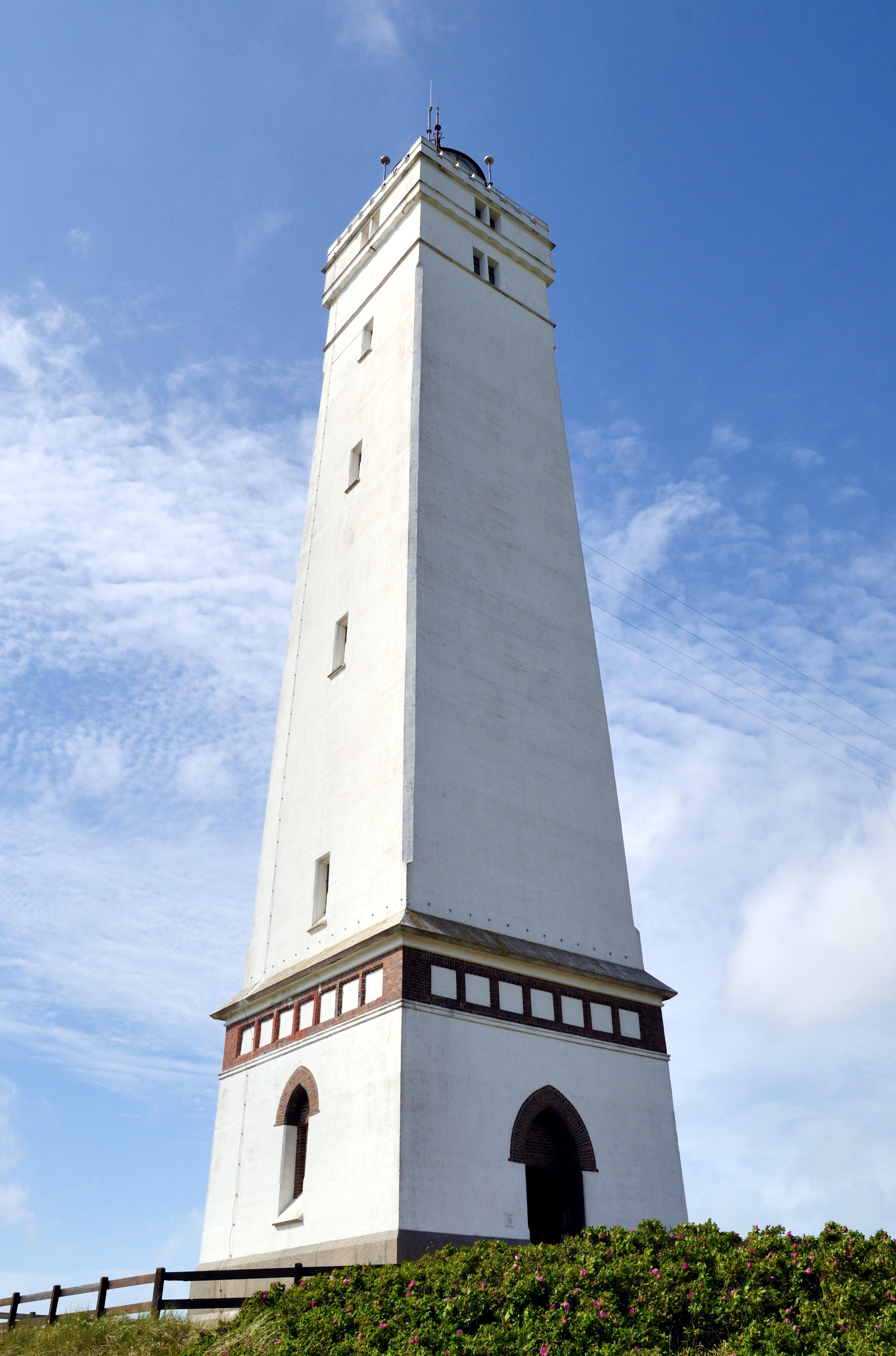
3

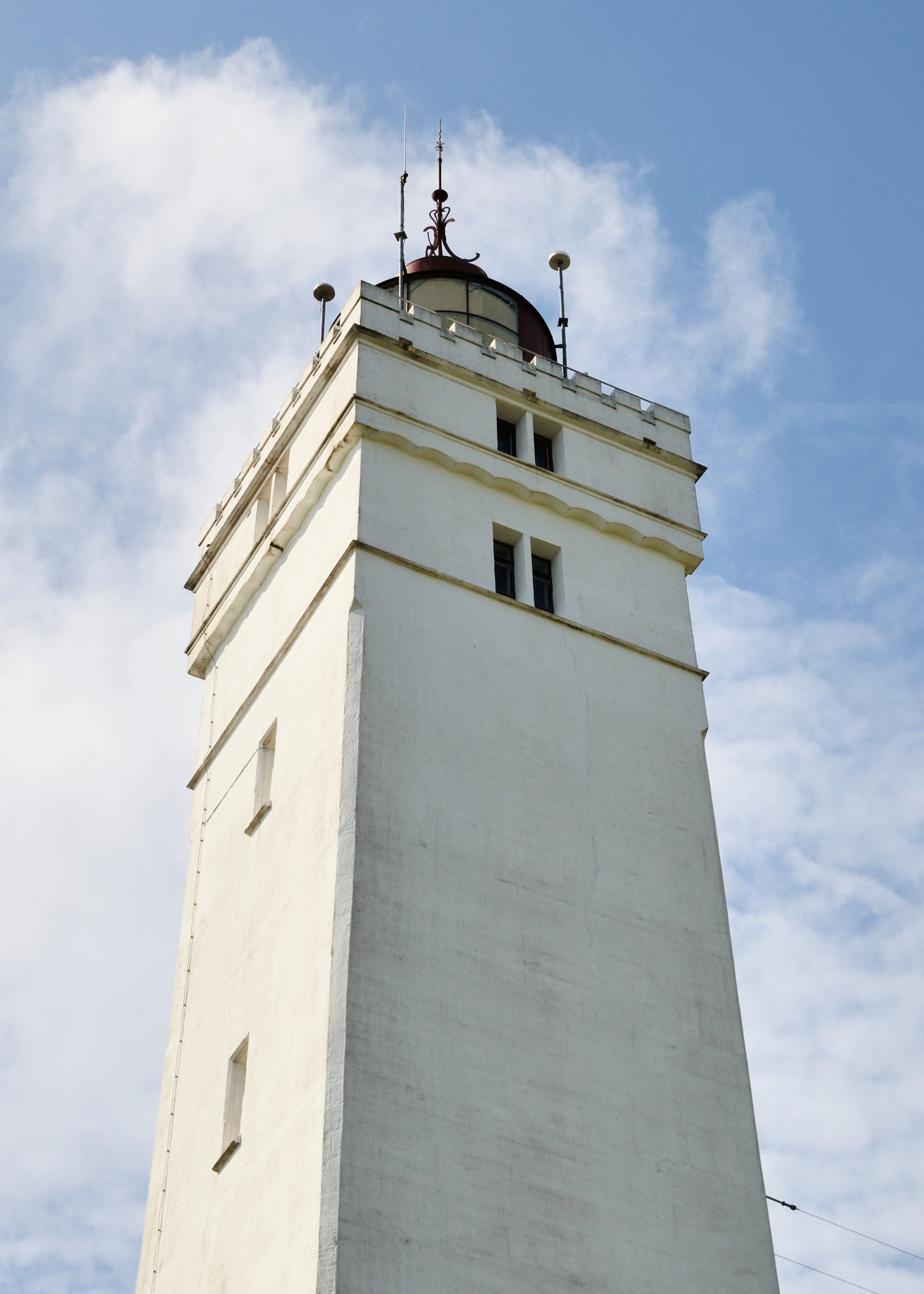
4
