= Lyngby Radio =

Coast radio station in Denmark

Coordinates: 55°45.95′N 12°28.5′E

Lyngby Radio (call sign OXZ) is a Danish coast radio station, operating on MF and VHF. Lyngby Radio stopped HF service on 1 October, 2009. Earlier, Lyngby Radio was one out of four Danish coast radio stations, the others being Skagen Radio, Blåvand Radio and Rønne Radio. All these stations are now remote controlled from Lyngby Radio.
