= Vejen railway station =

Railway station in Jutland, Denmark

Vejen
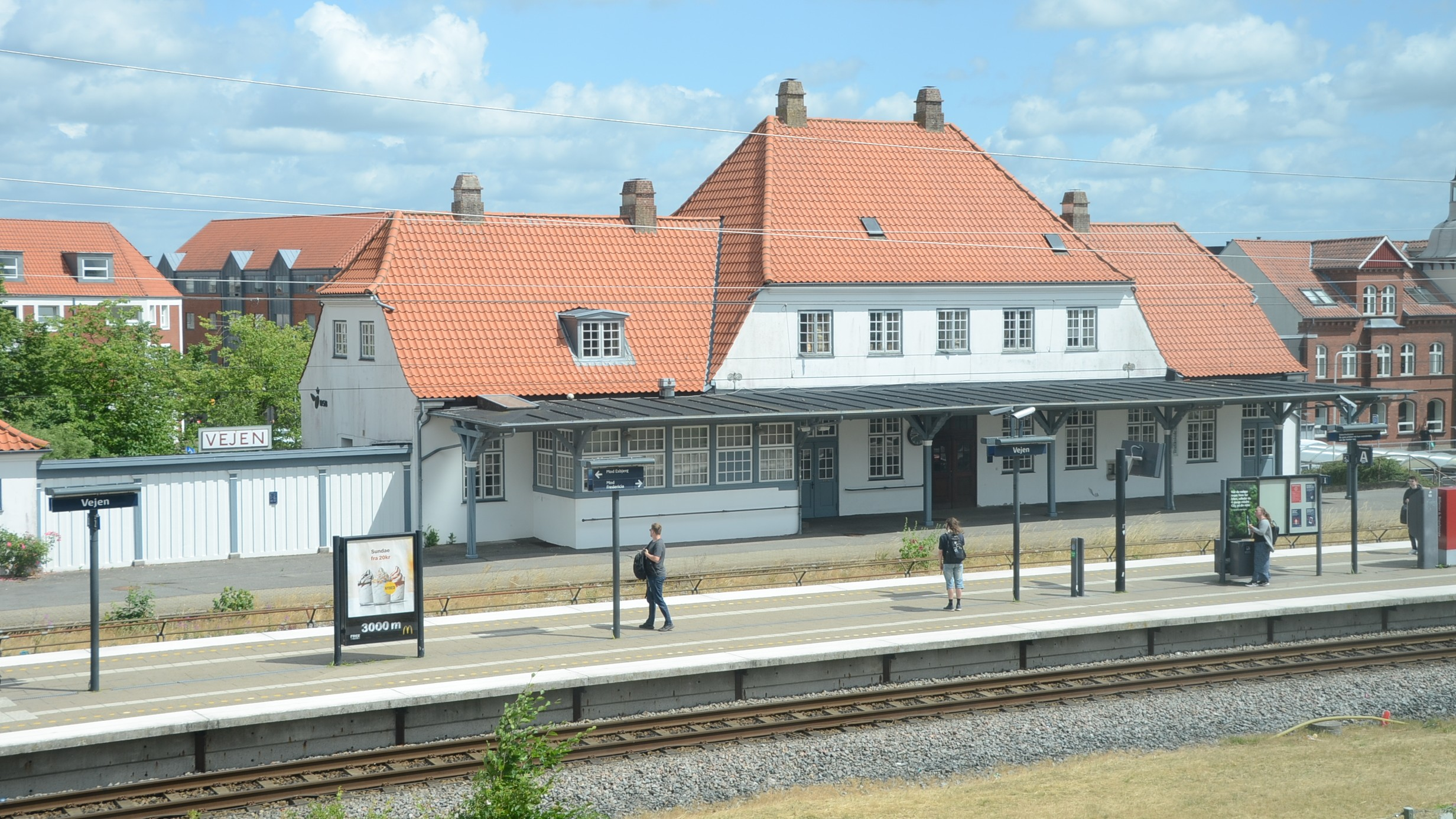
- Vejen station in 2023

General information
- Location: Banegårdspladsen 1; 6600 Vejen; Vejen Municipality; Denmark
- Coordinates: 55°28′33″N 9°8′9″E
- Elevation: 42.0 metres (137.8 ft)
- Owner: DSB (station infrastructure); Banedanmark (rail infrastructure)
- Lines: Lunderskov–Esbjerg (since 1874); Gesten–Vejen (1917–1951)
- Platforms: 1 island platform
- Tracks: 2
- Train operators: DSB

Construction
- Architect: Niels Peder Christian Holsøe (1874); Heinrich Wenck (1917)

Other information
- Station code: Vn
- Website: Official website

History
- Opened: 3 October 1874
- Rebuilt: 25 August 1917

Services
Preceding station	DSB	Following station
Kolding towards Østerport	Copenhagen–Esbjerg InterCity	Bramming towards Esbjerg
Lunderskov towards Aalborg	Aalborg–Esbjerg InterCity	Brørup towards Esbjerg
Location

Vejen railway station is a railway station serving the large railway town of Vejen between the cities of Kolding and Esbjerg in Jutland, Denmark.

Vejen railway station is located on the Lunderskov–Esbjerg railway line from Lunderskov to Esbjerg. The station opened in 1874, and its current station building was built to designs by the Danish architect Heinrich Wenck in 1917. It offers direct InterCity services to Esbjerg and Copenhagen and regional rail services to Esbjerg, Fredericia and Aarhus, both operated by the national railway company DSB.

== History ==
Vejen railway station opened on 3 October 1874 as one of the original intermediate stations on the Lunderskov–Esbjerg railway line. After the opening of the railway line, a railway town developed around the station.

In 1917, the station became a railway junction as the Troldhede-Kolding-Vejen Railway opened the railway line from Kolding to Troldhede with a short branch line from Gesten to Vejen which was opened on 25 August 1917. The Gesten–Vejen branch line was closed on 1 April 1951.

== Architecture ==
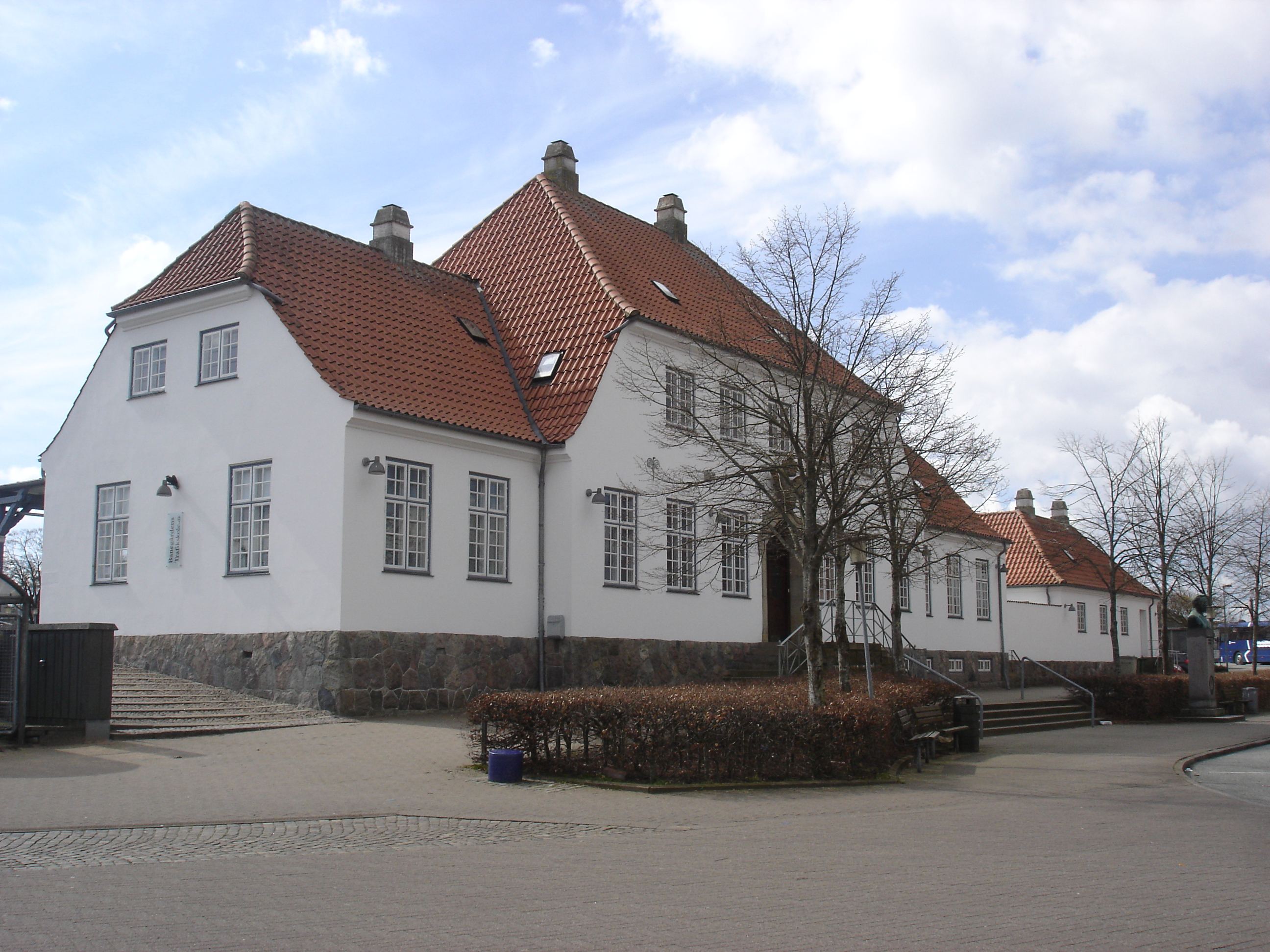
Street facade of the station building.

The original station building from 1874 was designed by the Danish architect Niels Peder Christian Holsøe (1826–1895), head architect of the Danish State Railways. Its current and still existing station building from 1917 was built to designs by the Danish architect Heinrich Wenck, known for the numerous railway stations he designed across Denmark in his capacity of head architect of the Danish State Railways.

== Services ==
Vejen station offers direct InterCity services to Esbjerg and Copenhagen and regional rail services to Esbjerg, Fredericia and Aarhus, both operated by the national railway company DSB.

== Gallery ==
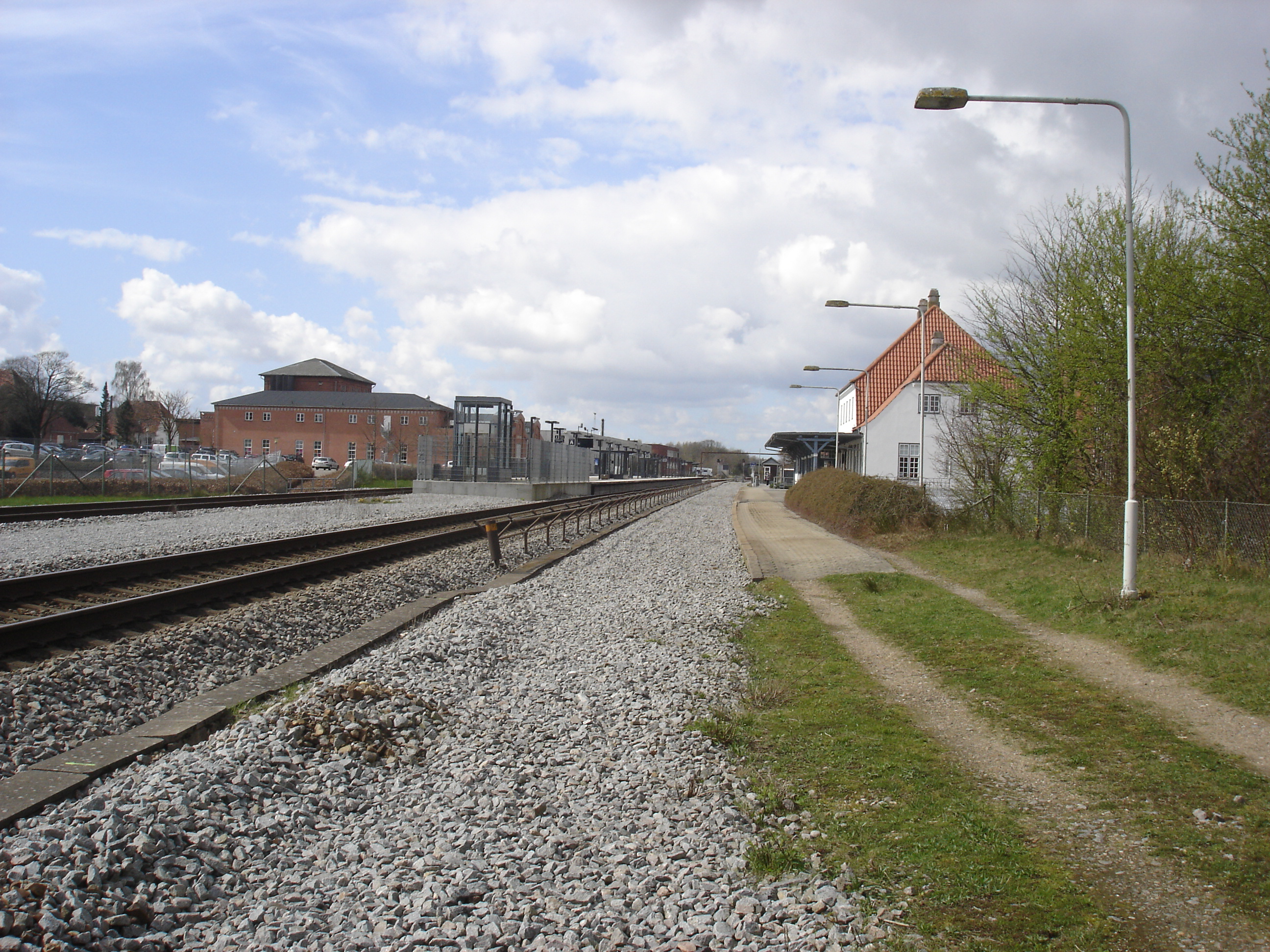

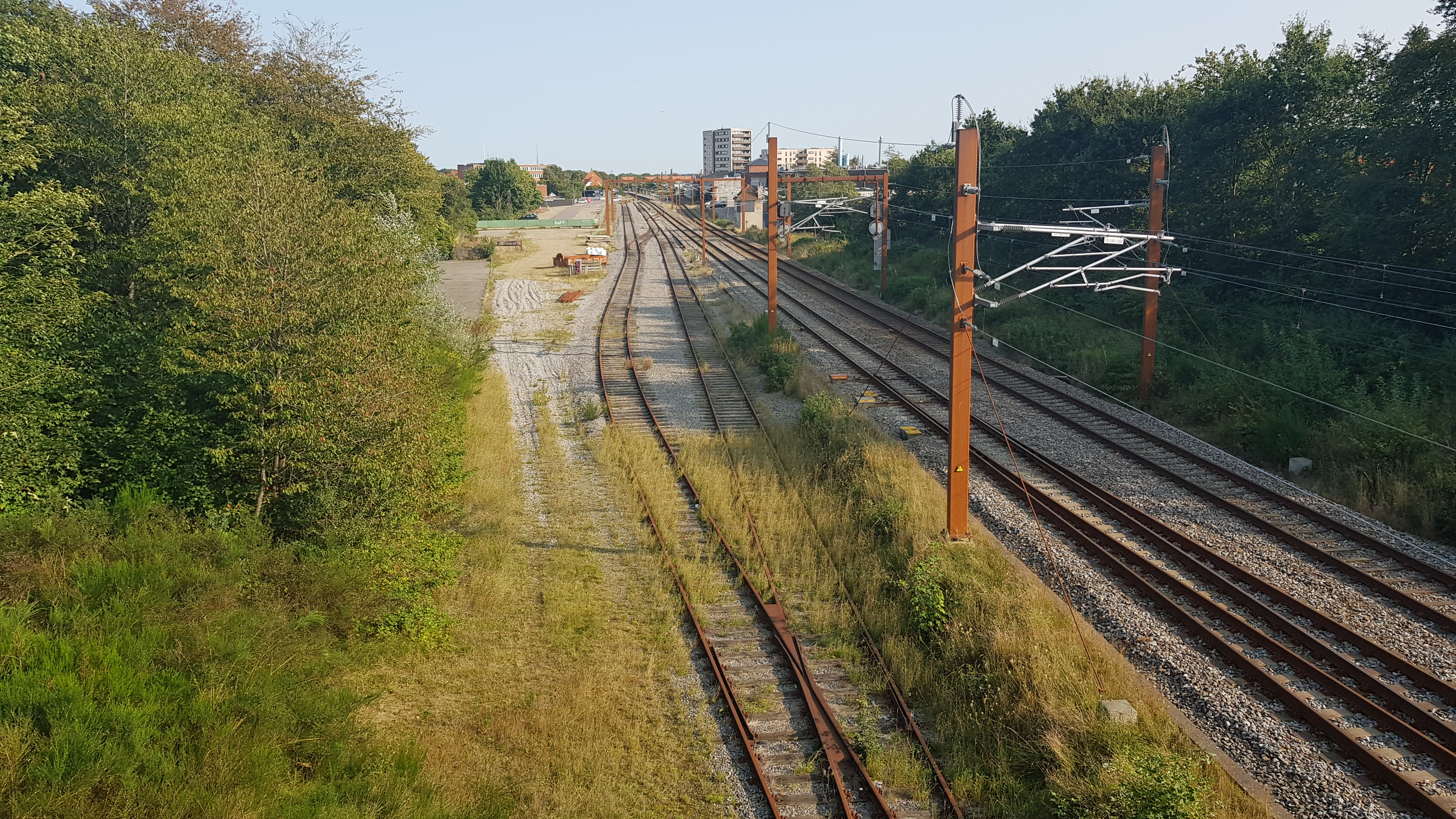

== See also ==
- List of railway stations in Denmark
- Rail transport in Denmark
- History of rail transport in Denmark
