= Brørup railway station =

Railway station in Jutland, Denmark

Brørup
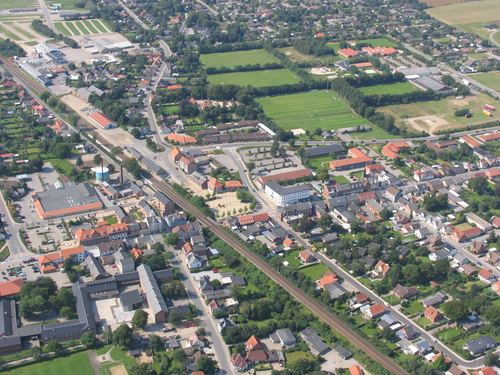
- Aerial photograph of Brørup station

General information
- Location: Jernbanegade 1; 6650 Brørup; Vejen Municipality; Denmark
- Coordinates: 55°28′57.6″N 9°0′58″E
- Elevation: 60.1 metres (197 ft)
- Owner: DSB (station infrastructure); Banedanmark (rail infrastructure)
- Line: Lunderskov–Esbjerg railway line
- Platforms: 2
- Tracks: 2
- Train operators: DSB

Construction
- Architect: Niels Peder Christian Holsøe

Other information
- Station code: Bp
- Website: Official website

History
- Opened: 3 October 1874

Services
Preceding station	DSB	Following station
Vejen towards Aalborg	Aalborg–Esbjerg InterCity	Holsted towards Esbjerg
Location

Brørup railway station is a railway station serving the railway town of Brørup between the cities of Kolding and Esbjerg in Jutland, Denmark.

Brørup railway station is located on the Lunderskov–Esbjerg railway line from Lunderskov to Esbjerg. The station opened in 1874. It offers regional rail services to Esbjerg, Fredericia and Aarhus operated by the national railway company DSB.

== History ==
Brørup railway station opened on 3 October 1874 as one of the original intermediate stations on the Lunderskov–Esbjerg railway line. The station opened where the railway line crossed the highway between Vejle and Ribe and approximately 1.5 km south of Brørup Church, located by the highway between Kolding and Varde. After the opening of the railway line, a railway town developed around the station.

== Architecture ==
The original and still existing station building from 1874 was designed by the Danish architect Niels Peder Christian Holsøe (1826–1895), known for the numerous railway stations he designed across Denmark in his capacity of head architect of the Danish State Railways.

== Services ==
The station offers frequent regional rail services to Esbjerg, Fredericia and Aarhus operated by the national railway company DSB.

== Gallery ==
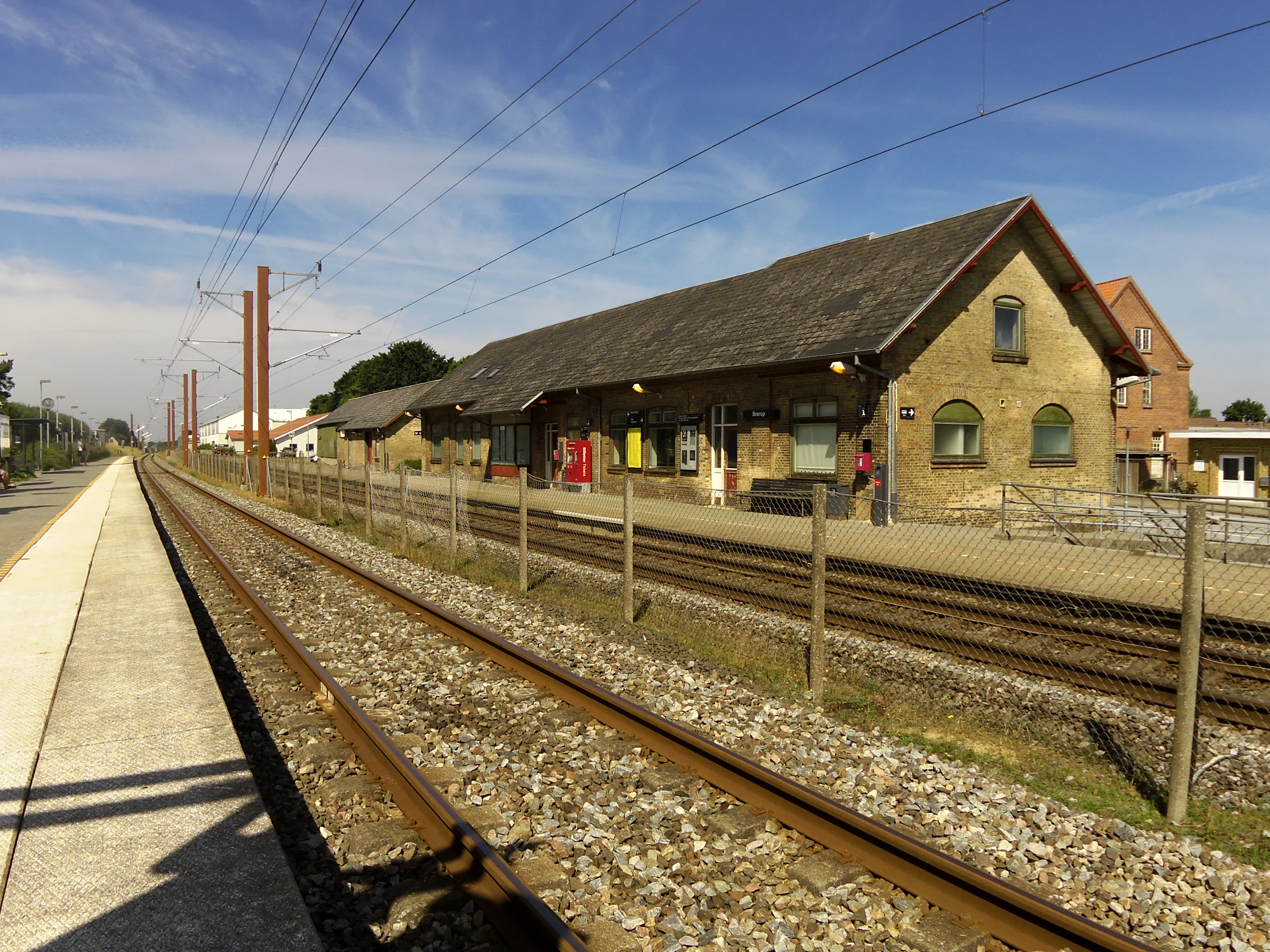

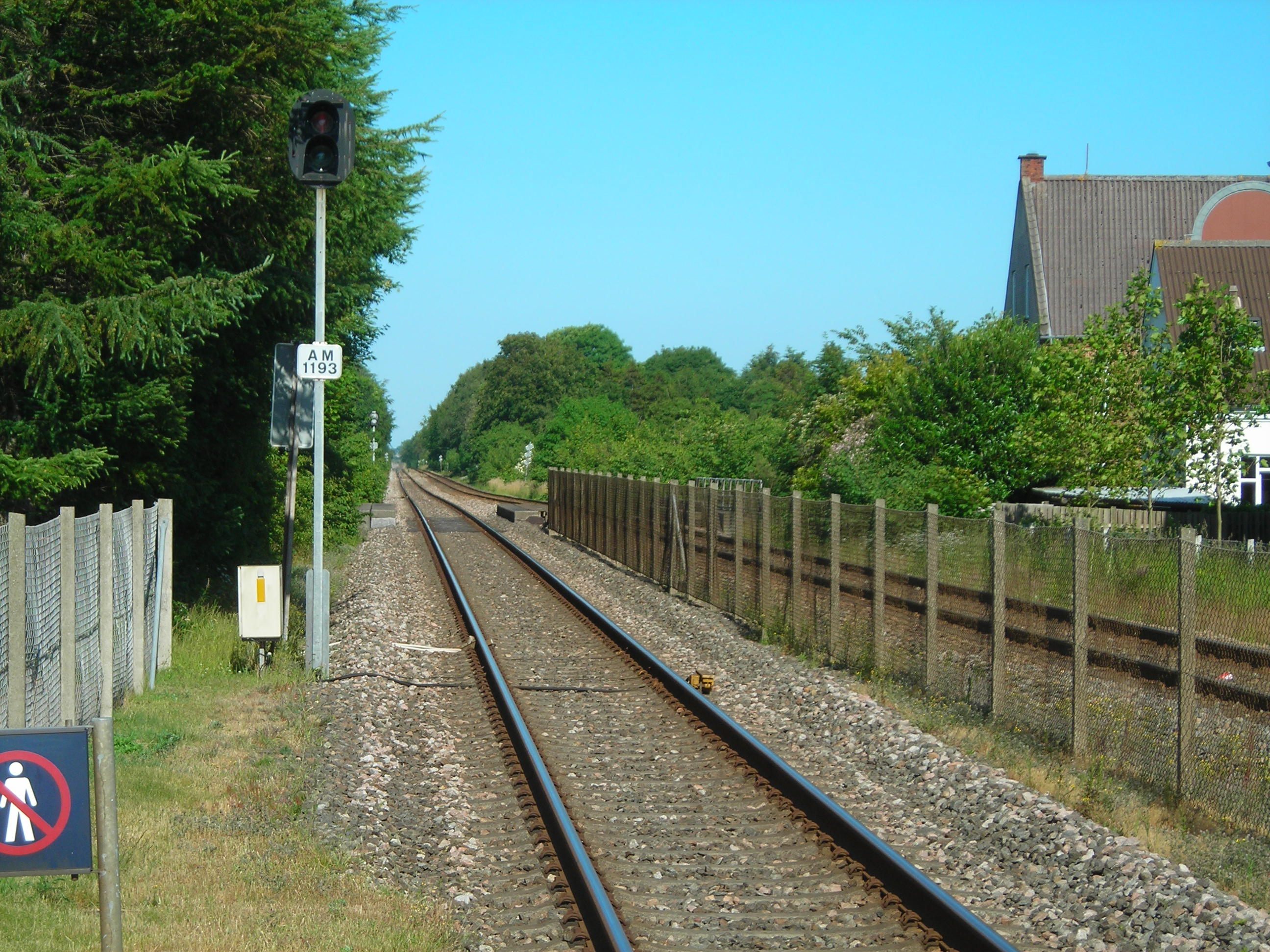

== See also ==
- List of railway stations in Denmark
- Rail transport in Denmark
- History of rail transport in Denmark
