= Tjæreborg railway station =

Railway station in West Jutland, Denmark

Tjæreborg
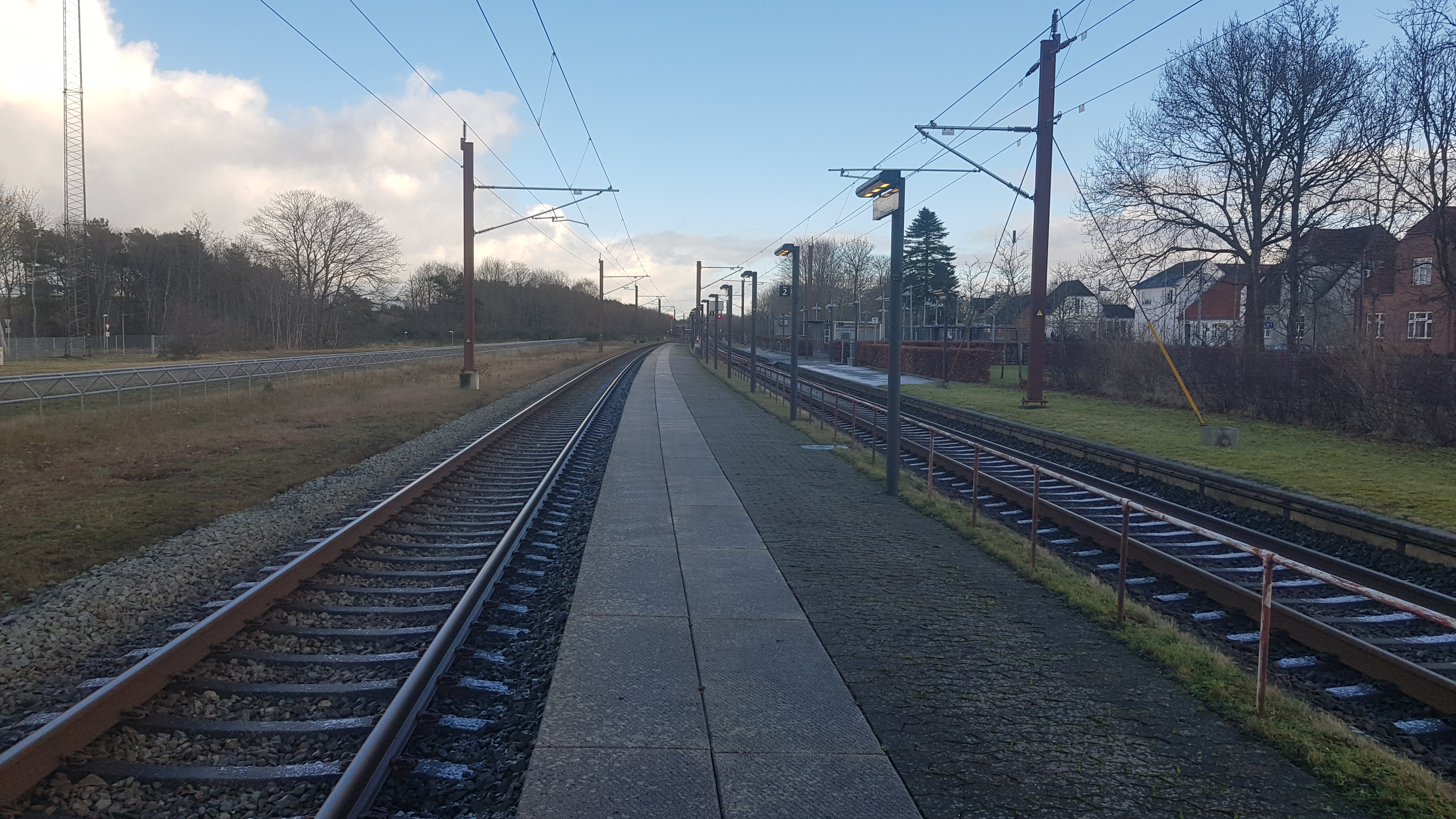
- Tjæreborg station in 2021

General information
- Location: Tjæreborg Stationsvej 20; 6731 Tjæreborg; Esbjerg Municipality; Denmark
- Coordinates: 55°27′59.5″N 8°34′46″E
- Elevation: 12.1 metres (40 ft)
- Owner: Banedanmark
- Line: Lunderskov–Esbjerg railway line
- Platforms: 2
- Tracks: 2
- Train operators: GoCollective

Construction
- Architect: Niels Peder Christian Holsøe

Other information
- Station code: Tb
- Website: Official website

History
- Opened: 3 October 1874
- Former names: Tjereborg

Services
Preceding station	GoCollective	Following station
Jerne towards Esbjerg	Esbjerg–Niebüll Regional train	Bramming towards Niebüll
Location

Tjæreborg railway station is a railway station serving the railway town of Tjæreborg east of the city of Esbjerg in West Jutland, Denmark.

Tjæreborg railway station is located on the Lunderskov–Esbjerg railway line from Lunderskov to Esbjerg. The station opened in 1874. It offers regional rail services to Esbjerg, Ribe, Tønder, and Niebüll in Germany, operated by the private public transport operating company GoCollective.

== History ==
Tjæreborg railway station opened on 3 October 1874 as on one of the original intermediate stations on the Lunderskov–Esbjerg railway line. The station building from 1874, built to designs by the Danish architect Niels Peder Christian Holsøe, was torn down in 2002.

== Services ==
The station offers direct regional rail services to Esbjerg, Ribe, Tønder, and Niebüll in Germany, operated by the private public transport operating company GoCollective.

== Gallery ==
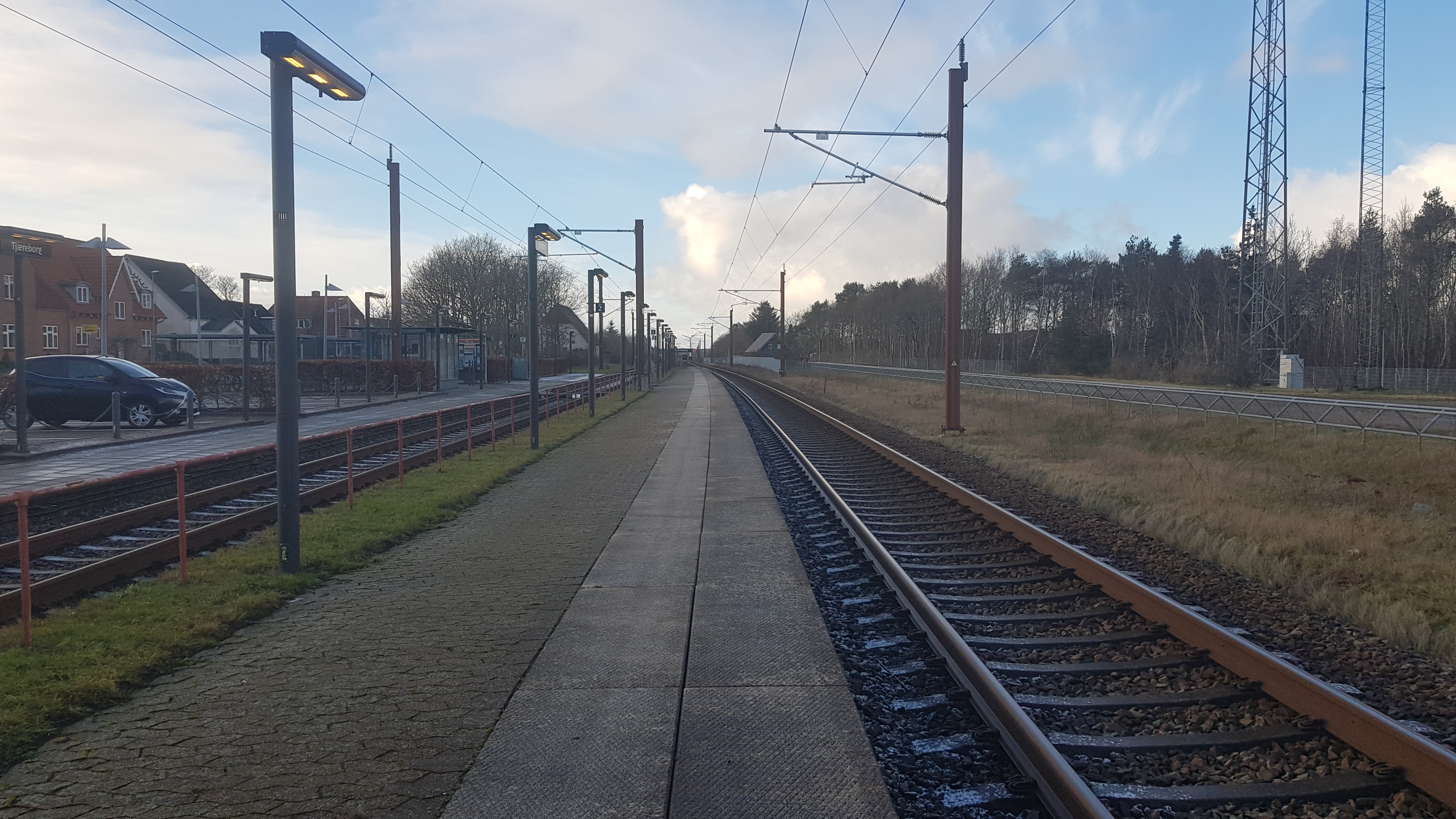

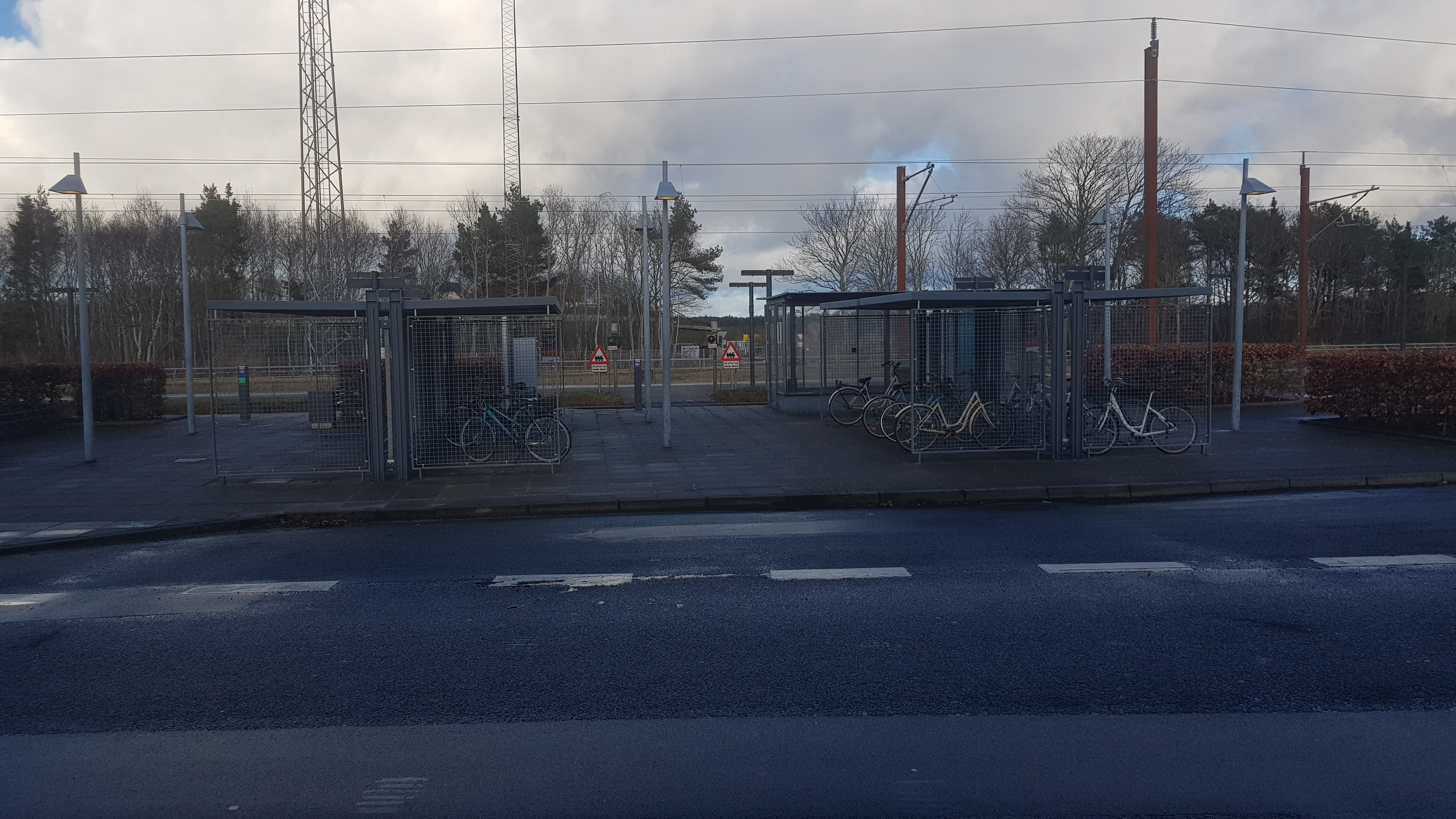

== See also ==
- List of railway stations in Denmark
- Rail transport in Denmark
