= Tjæreborg =

Tjæreborg may refer to:

- Tjæreborg, Denmark, a village on the west coast of Denmark, about 9 km east of Esbjerg
- A former travel agency based at Tjæreborg: see Sterling Airlines#History
