= Gørding =

- Town
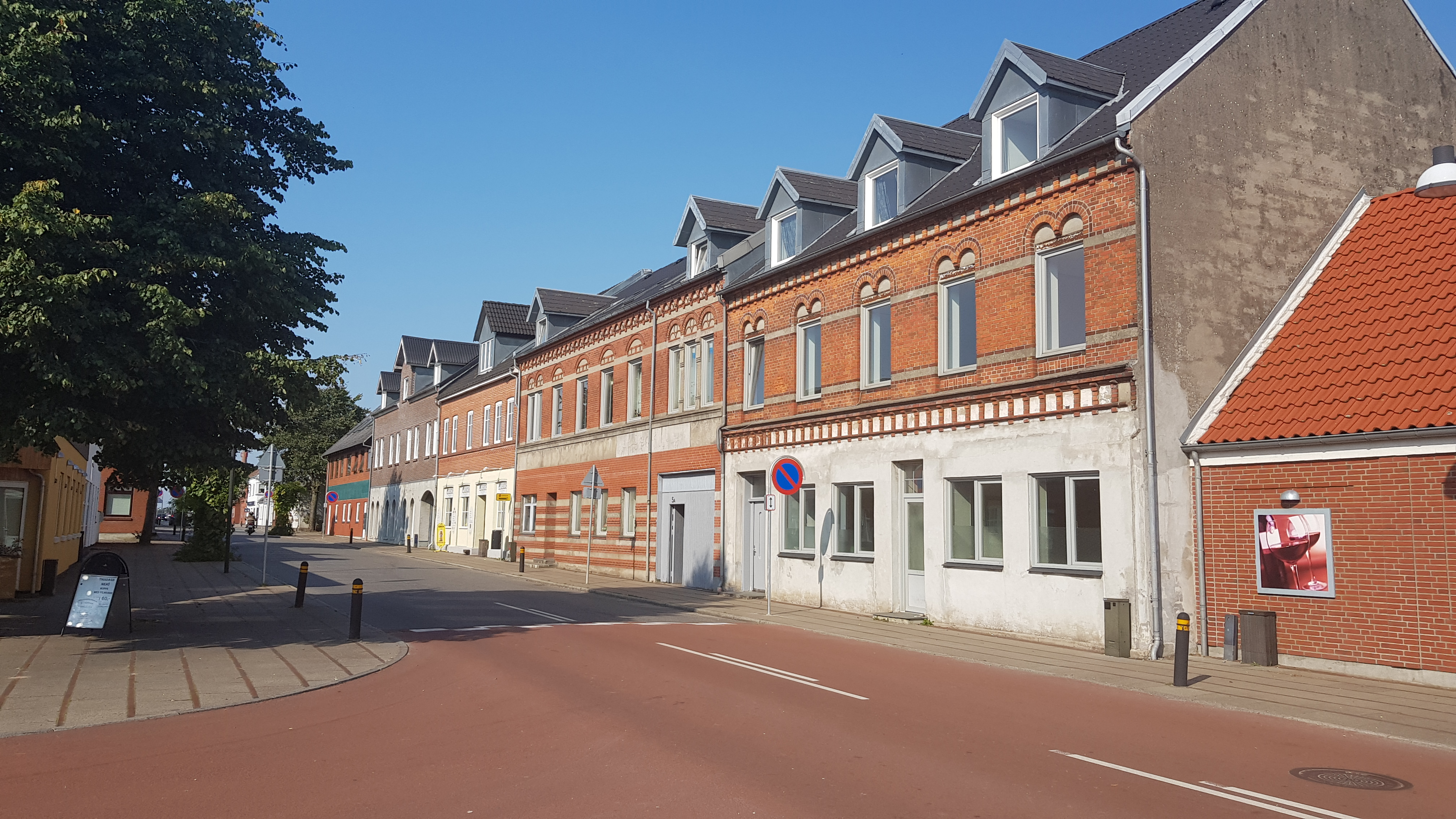
- Nørregade, the main street in Gørding

- Location in Denmark Gørding (Region of Southern Denmark)
- Coordinates: 55°28′24″N 8°47′56″E
- Country: Denmark
- Region: Southern Denmark
- Municipality: Esbjerg Municipality

Area
  - Urban: 1.5 km^{2} (0.58 sq mi)

Population (2026)
  - Urban: 1,774
  - Urban density: 1,200/km^{2} (3,100/sq mi)
- Time zone: UTC+1 (CET)
  - Summer (DST): UTC+2 (CEST)
- Postal code: DK-6690 Gørding
- Website: gording.dk

Gørding is a railway town, with a population of 1,774 (1 January 2026), in Esbjerg Municipality, Region of Southern Denmark in Denmark.

Gørding is served by Gørding railway station on the Lunderskov–Esbjerg railway line.

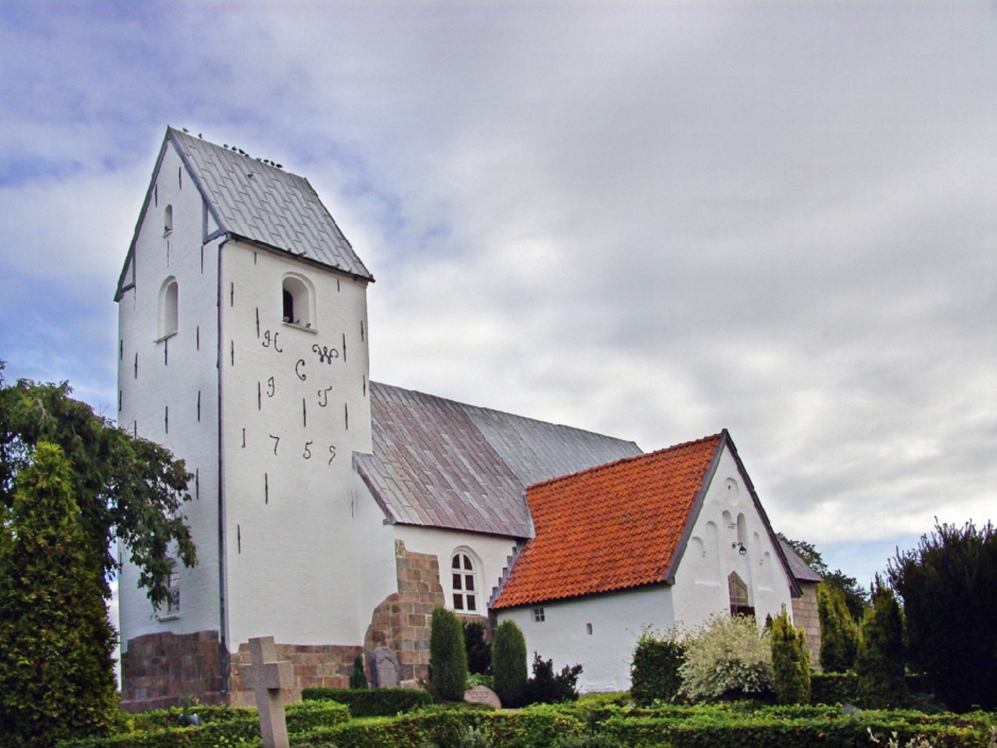
Gørding Church

The church is located on the northern outskirts of Gørding separated from most of the town by the stream of Holsted Å. It is a tufted stone church built around the year 1200, while the tower and entrance are from the late Gothic period around the year 1500.

== Notable people ==
- Daniel Iversen (born 1997 in Gørding), a professional footballer.
