= Gørding railway station =

Railway station in West Jutland, Denmark

Gørding
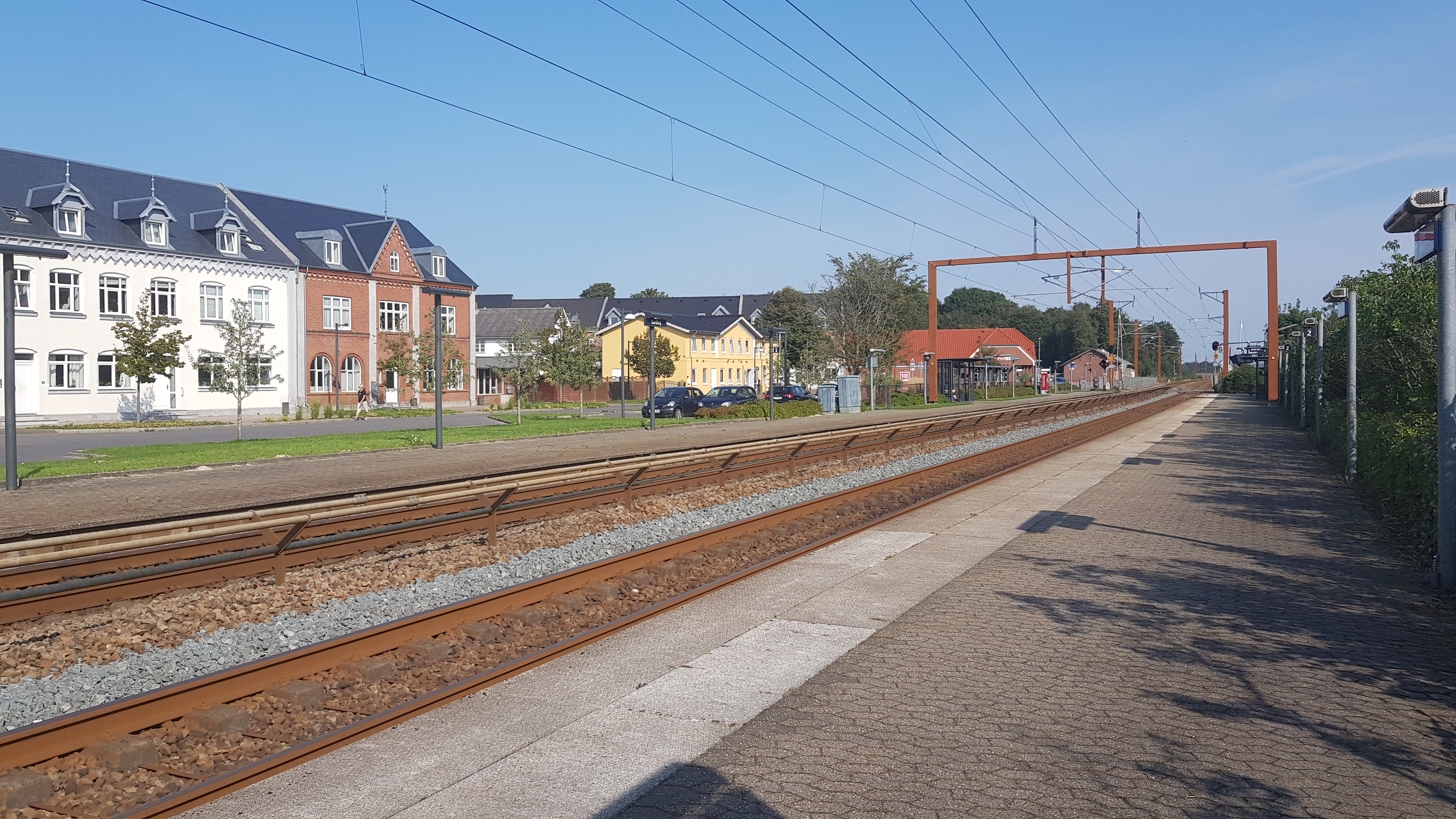
- Gørding station in 2020

General information
- Location: Jernbanegade 2; 6690 Gørding; Esbjerg Municipality; Denmark
- Coordinates: 55°28′10.3″N 8°48′3″E
- Elevation: 22.6 metres (74 ft)
- Owner: DSB (station infrastructure); Banedanmark (rail infrastructure)
- Line: Lunderskov–Esbjerg railway line
- Platforms: 2
- Tracks: 2
- Train operators: DSB

Construction
- Architect: Niels Peder Christian Holsøe

Other information
- Station code: Gø
- Website: Official website

History
- Opened: 3 October 1874

Services
Preceding station	DSB	Following station
Holsted towards Aalborg	Aalborg–Esbjerg InterCity	Bramming towards Esbjerg
Location

Gørding railway station is a railway station serving the railway town of Gørding east of the city of Esbjerg in West Jutland, Denmark.

Gørding railway station is located on the Lunderskov–Esbjerg railway line from Lunderskov to Esbjerg. The station opened in 1874. It offers regional rail services to Esbjerg, Fredericia and Aarhus operated by the national railway company DSB.

== History ==
Gørding railway station opened on 3 October 1874 as on one of the original intermediate stations on the Lunderskov–Esbjerg railway line. The station building from 1874, built to designs by the Danish architect Niels Peder Christian Holsøe, was torn down in 2013.

== Services ==
The station offers frequent regional rail services to Esbjerg, Fredericia and Aarhus operated by the national railway company DSB.

== Gallery ==
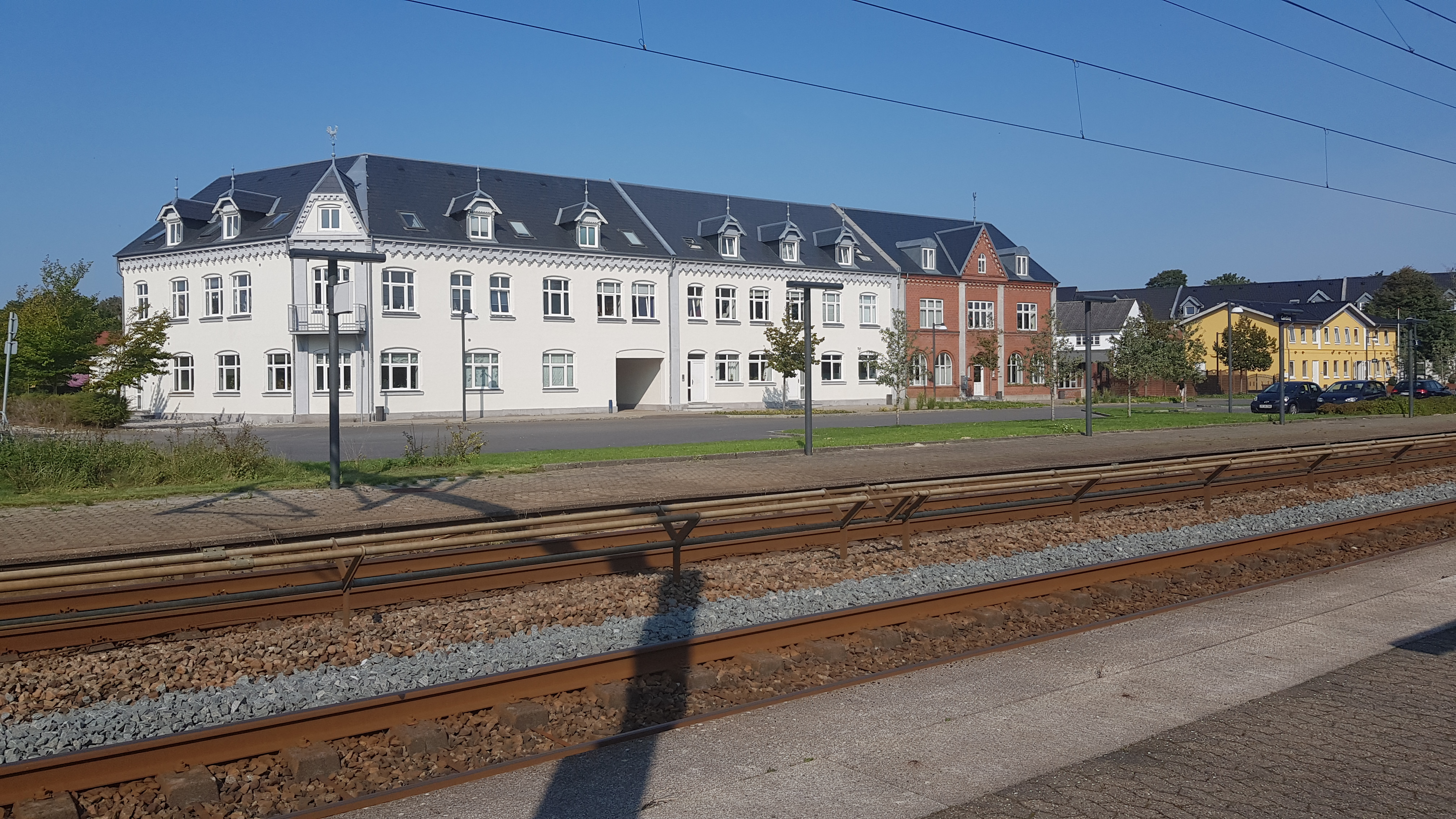

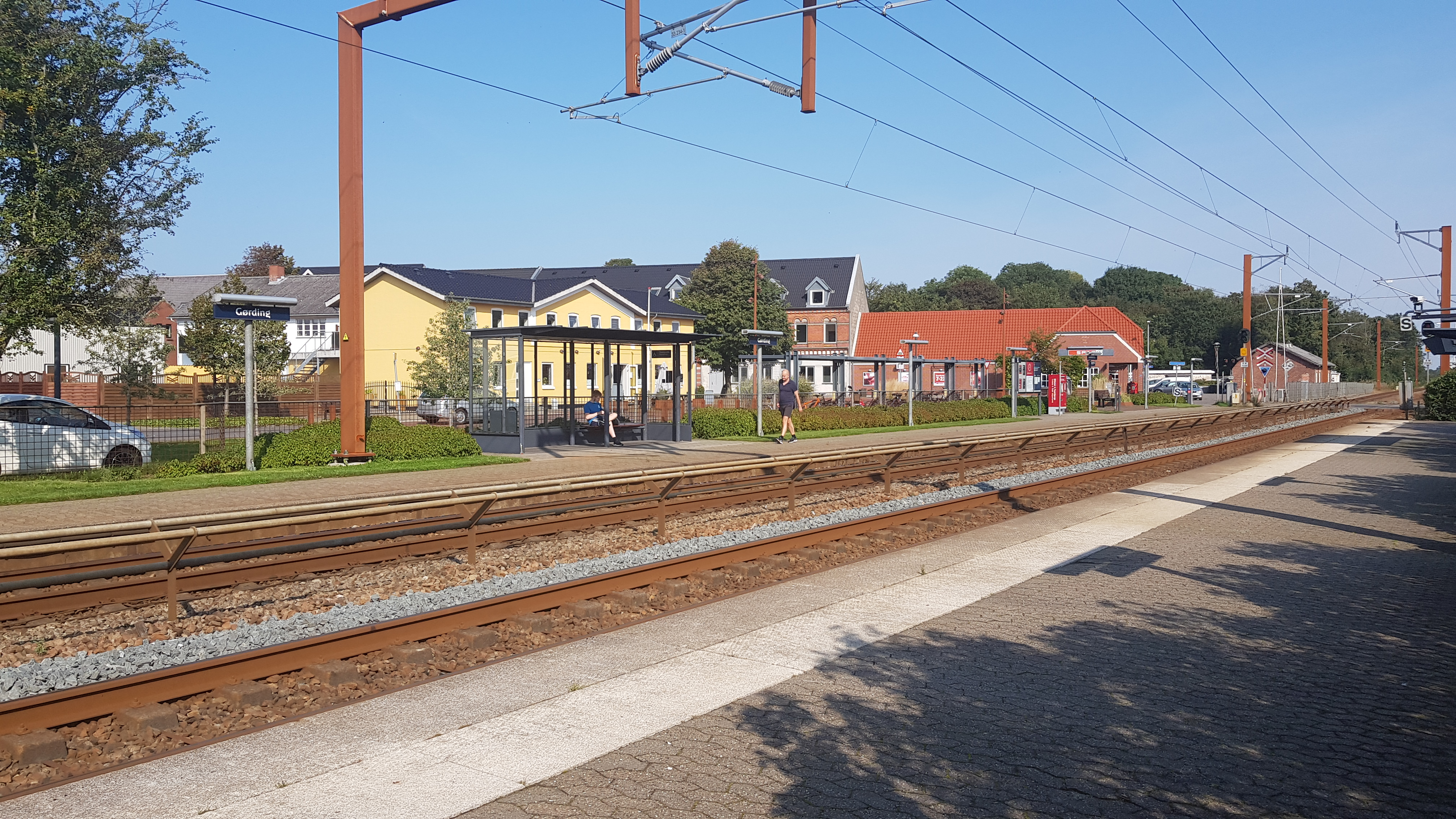

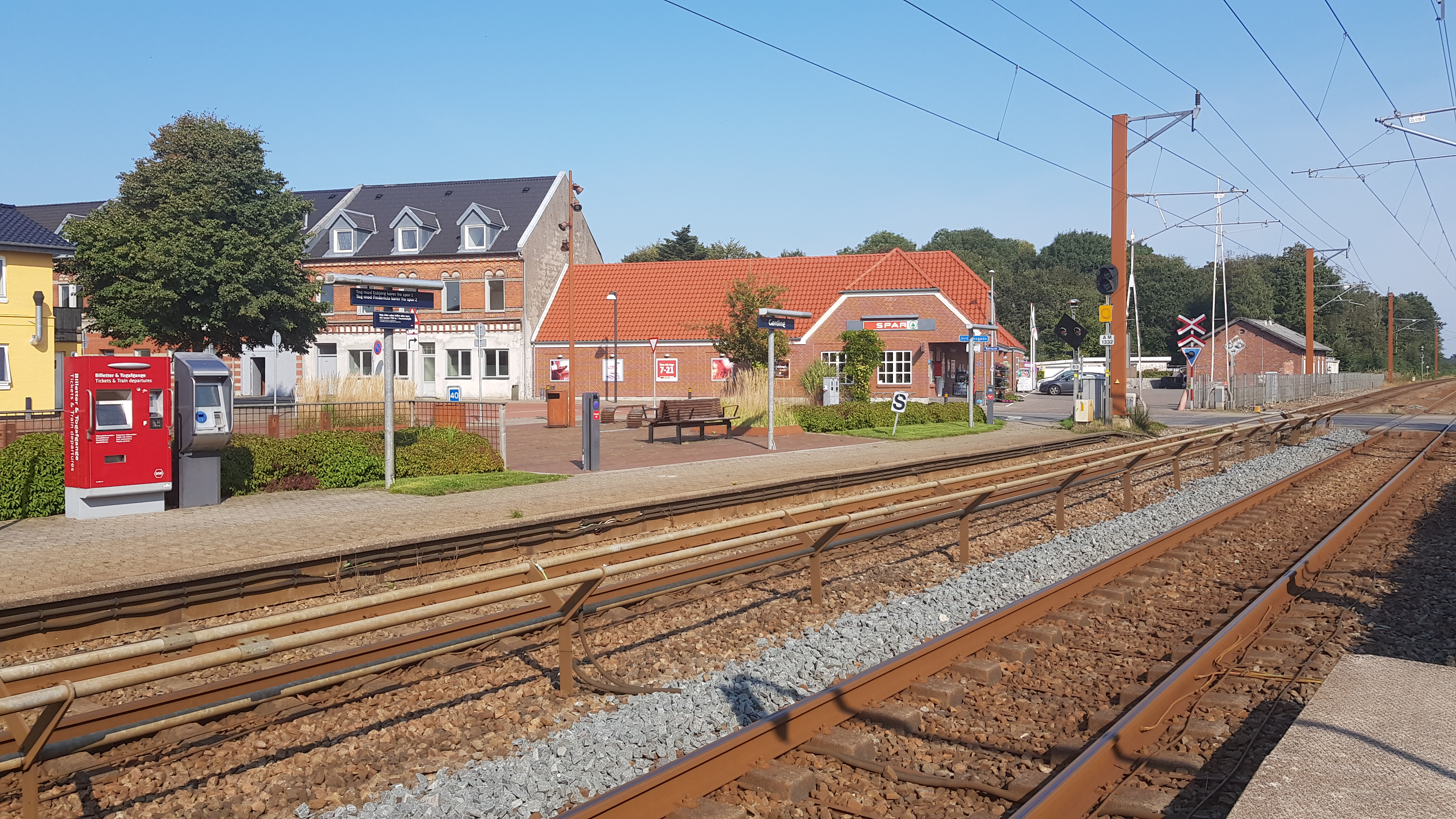

== See also ==
- List of railway stations in Denmark
- Rail transport in Denmark
