= Jerne railway halt =

Railway halt in West Jutland, Denmark

Jerne
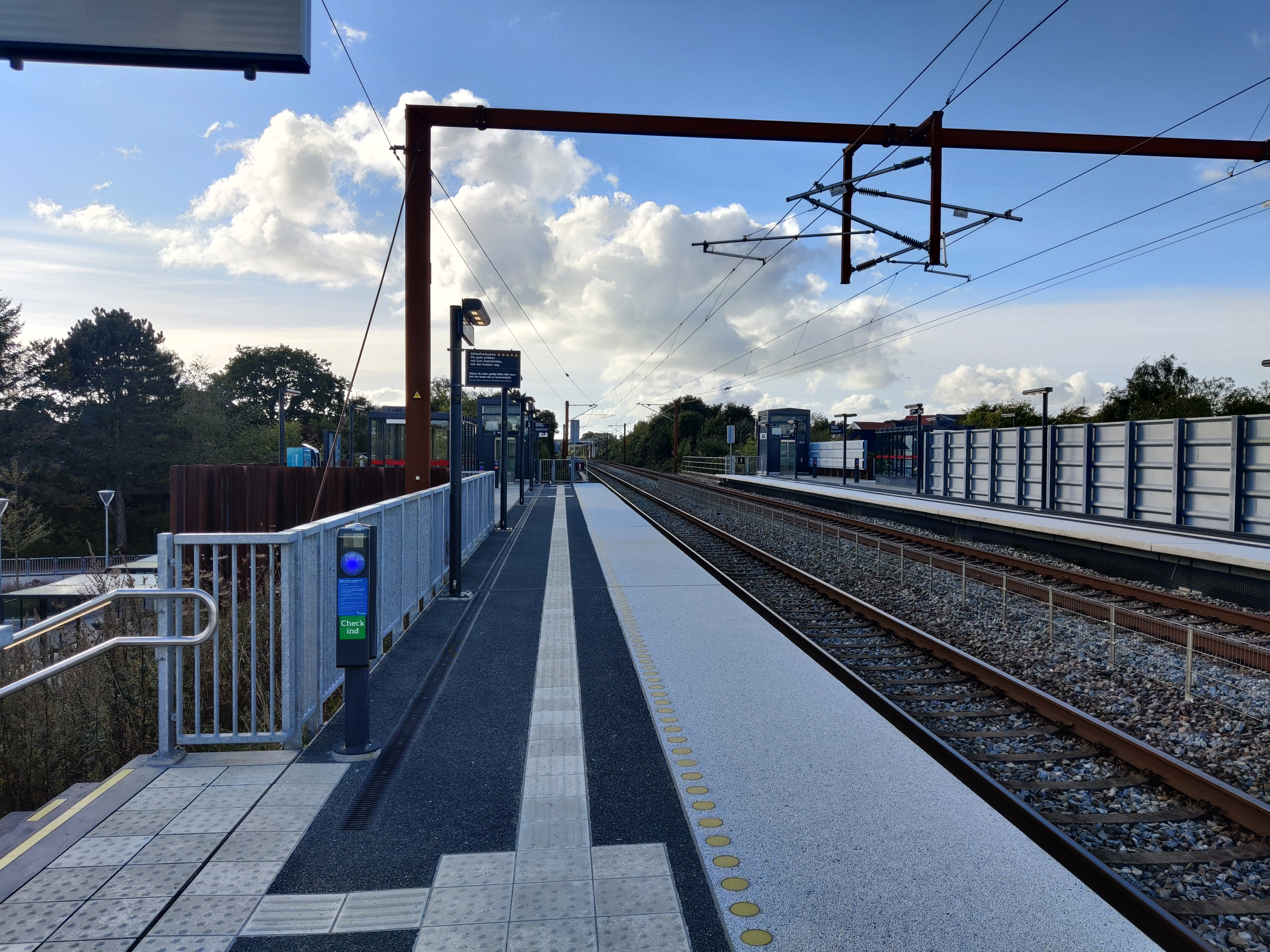
- Jerne railway halt in 2022

General information
- Location: Skolebakken 95; 6705 Esbjerg N Esbjerg Municipality; Denmark
- Coordinates: 55°28′28″N 8°29′10″E
- Elevation: 17.2 metres (56 ft)
- Owner: Banedanmark
- Line: Lunderskov–Esbjerg railway line
- Platforms: 2
- Tracks: 2
- Train operators: GoCollective

Other information
- Website: Official website

History
- Opened: 13 December 2020

Services
Preceding station	GoCollective	Following station
Esbjerg Terminus	Esbjerg–Niebüll Regional train	Tjæreborg towards Niebüll
Location

Jerne railway halt is a railway halt serving the district of Jerne in the eastern part of the city of Esbjerg, Denmark. The station is located in the central part of the district where the railway line crosses the street Skolebakken.

Jerne railway halt is located on the Lunderskov–Esbjerg railway line from Lunderskov to Esbjerg. The halt opened in 2020. It offers regional rail services to Esbjerg, Ribe, Tønder, and Niebüll in Germany, operated by the private public transport operating company GoCollective.

== History ==
Jerne railway halt was constructed in 2020 on the Lunderskov–Esbjerg railway line which opened in 1874. Construction work began in June 2020 and the railway halt opened on 13 December 2020. Due to the COVID-19 pandemic, the inauguration was held digitally. The station itself was built by Banedanmark, while Esbjerg Municipality established the station's forecourt, which was inaugurated on 14 July 2021.

== Services ==
The station offers direct regional rail services to Esbjerg, Ribe, Tønder, and Niebüll in Germany, operated by the private public transport operating company GoCollective.

== Gallery ==
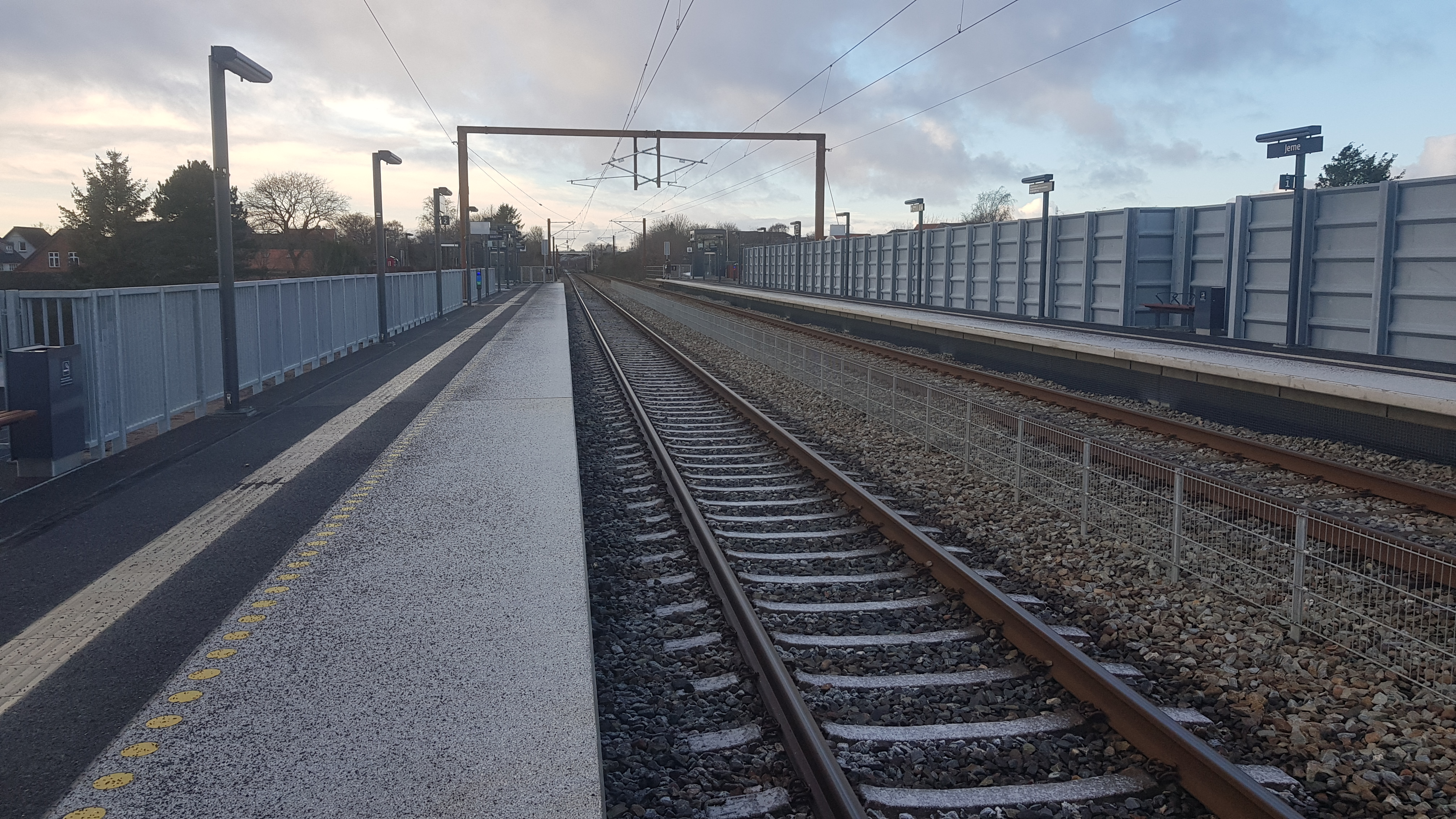

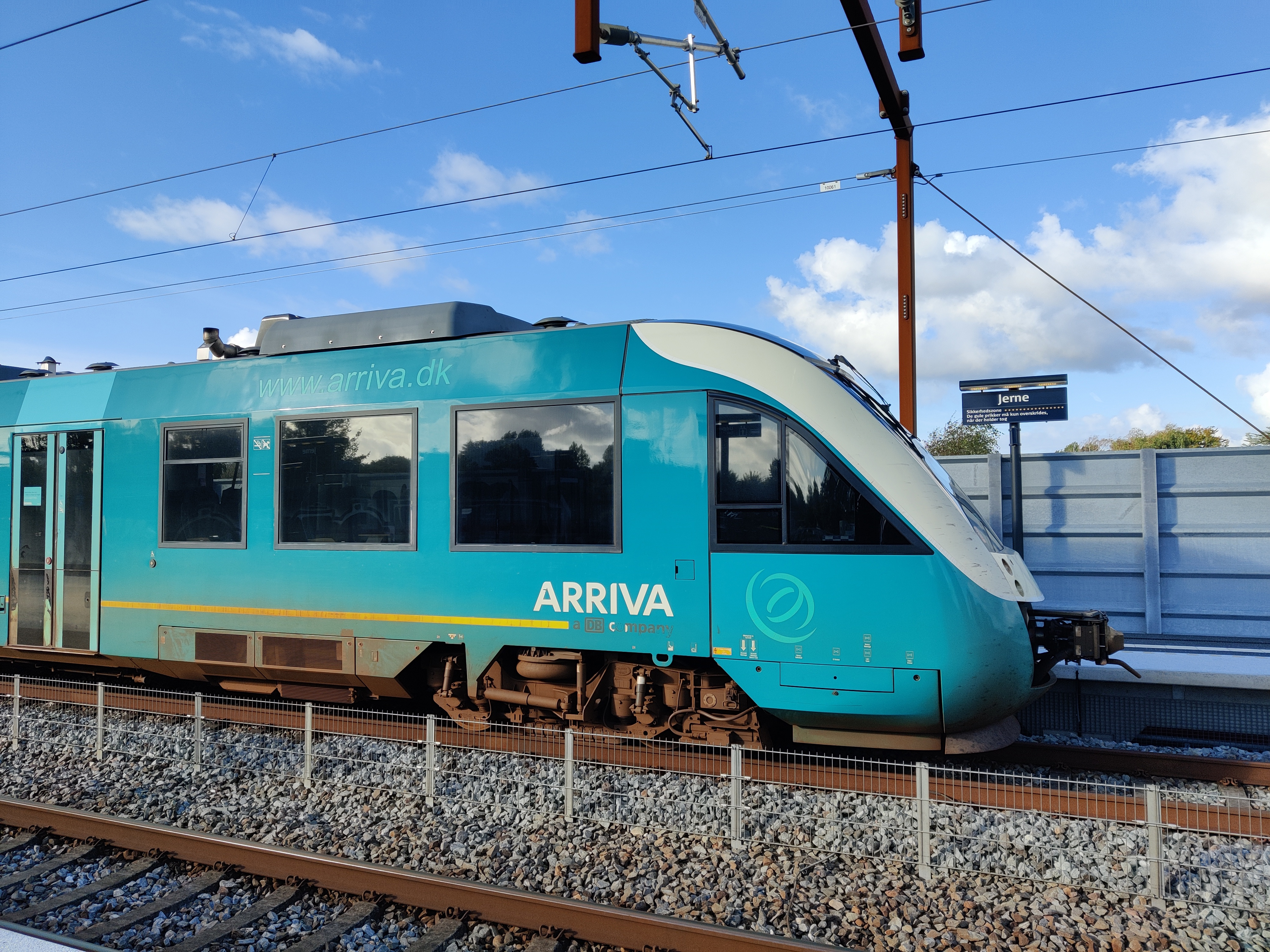

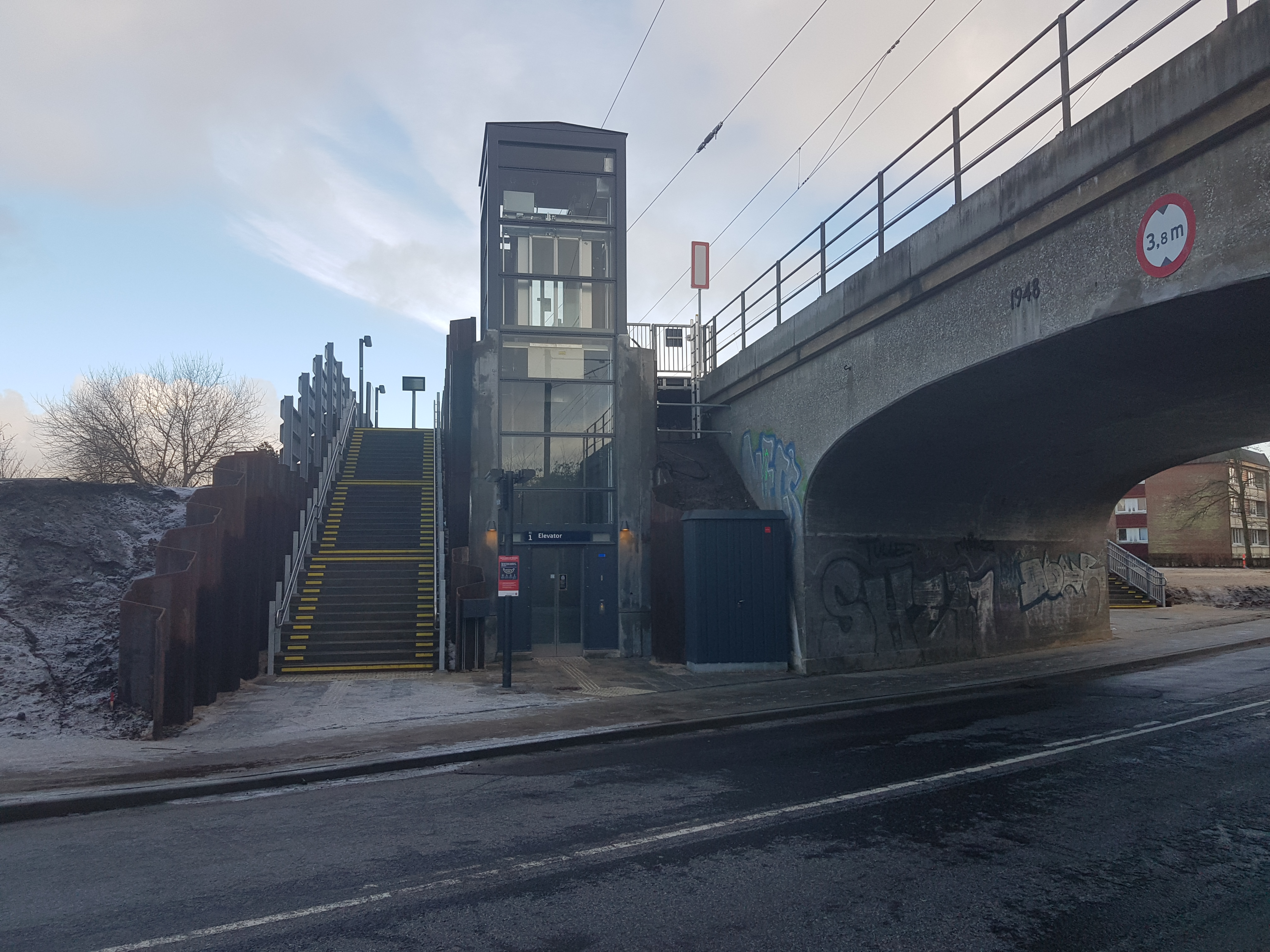

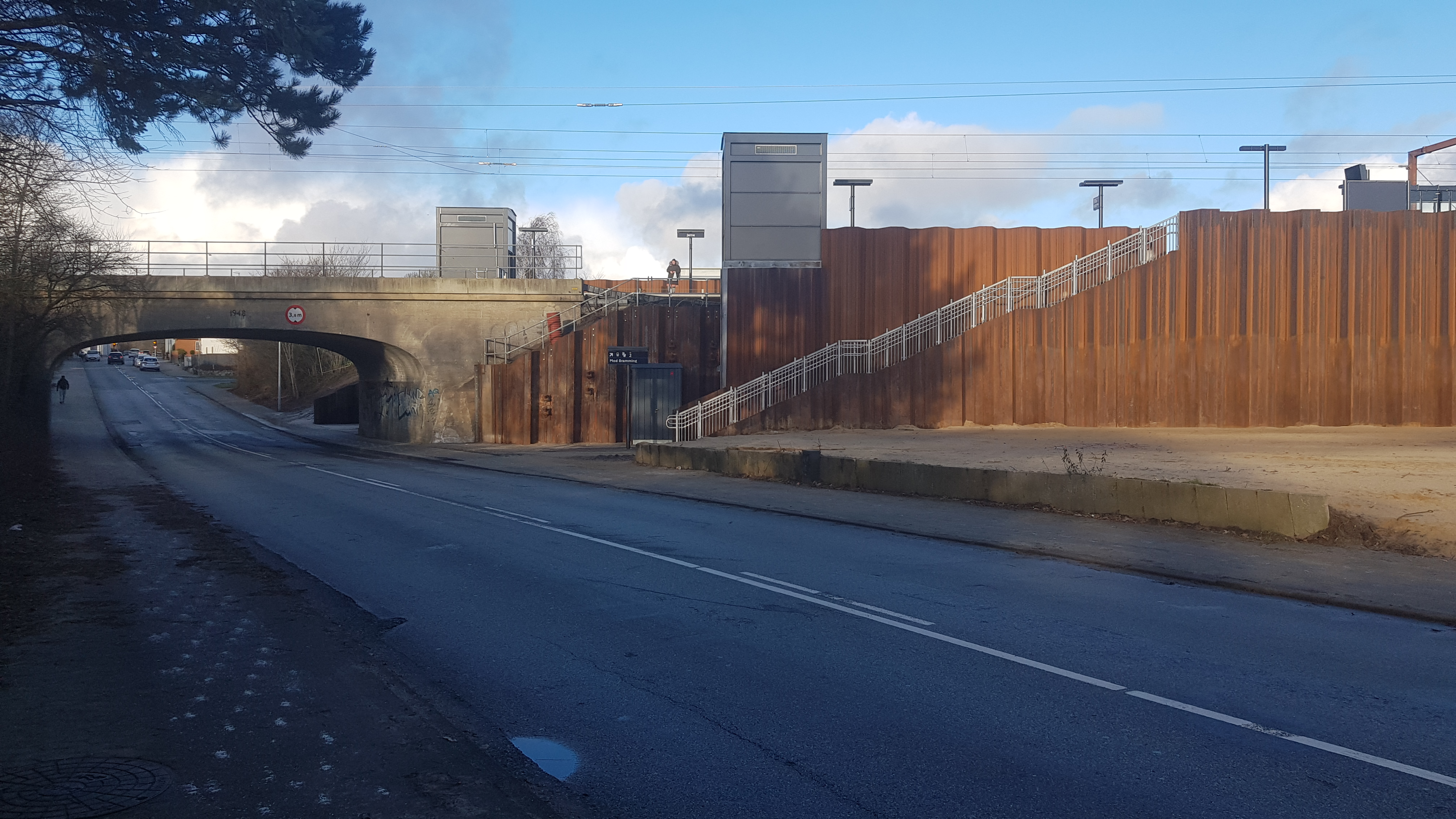

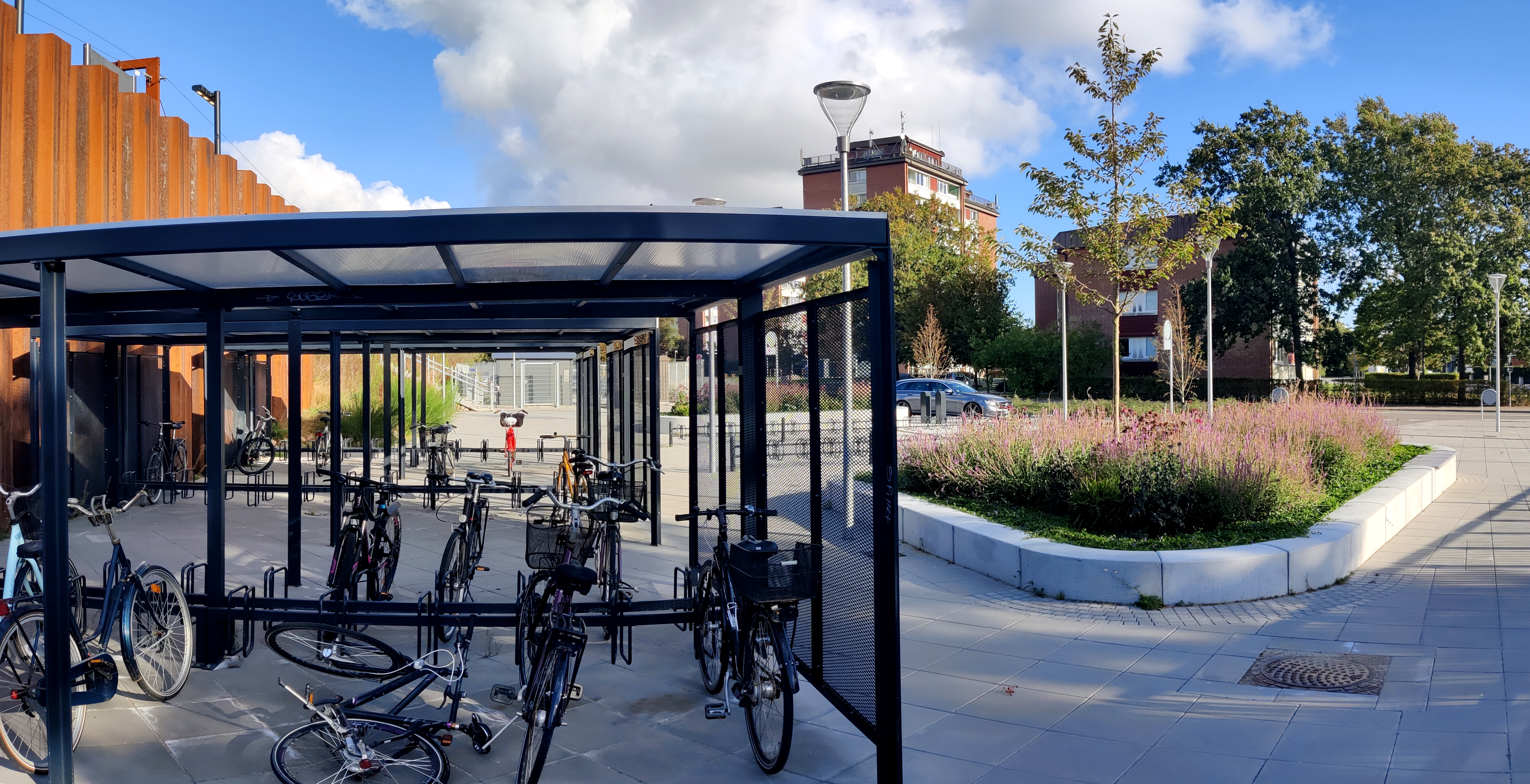
Bike stands

== See also ==
- List of railway stations in Denmark
- Rail transport in Denmark
