= Tjæreborg, Denmark =

Tjæreborg
- Town
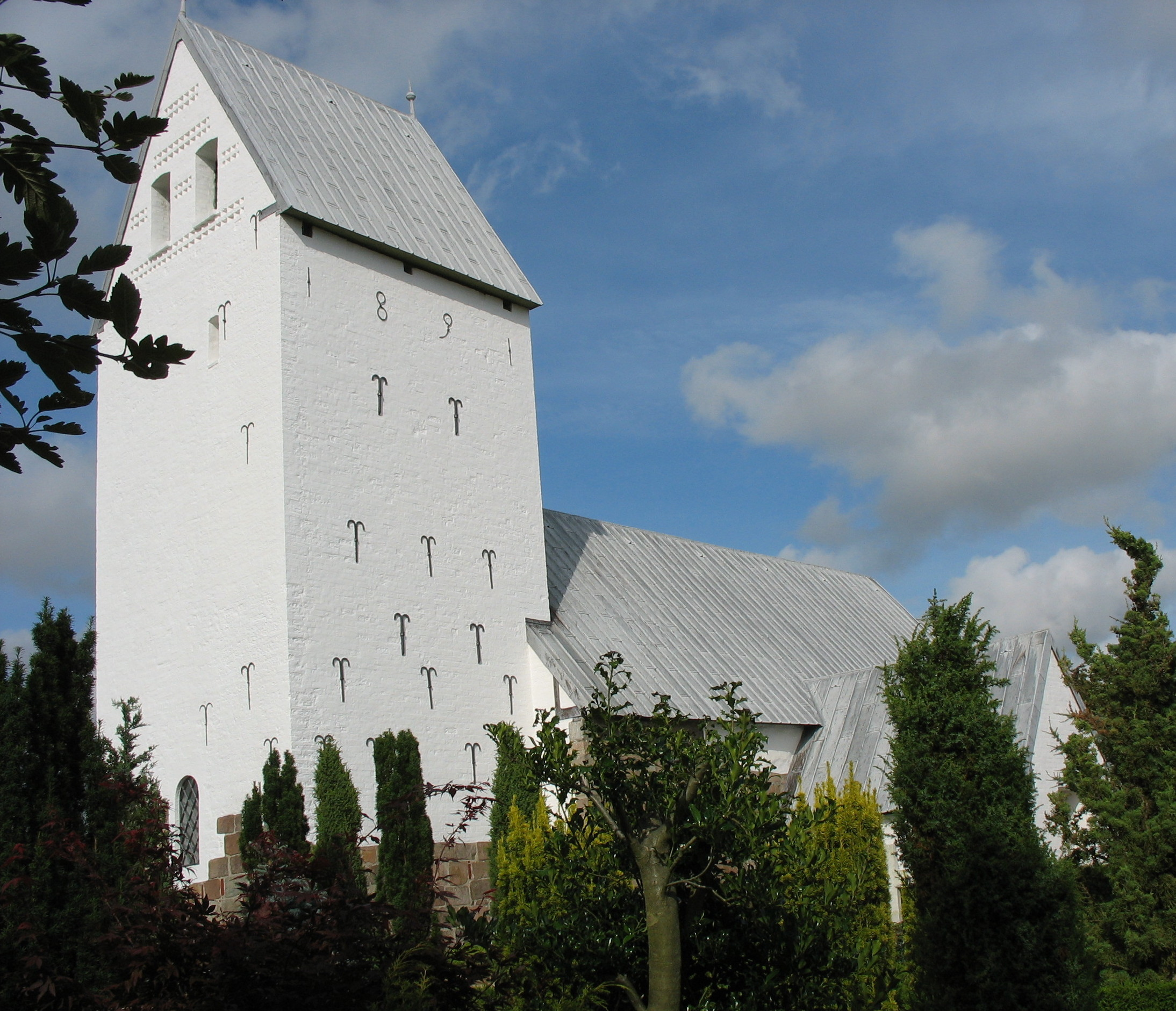
- Tjæreborg Church

- Location in Denmark Tjæreborg (Region of Southern Denmark)
- Coordinates: 55°27′49″N 8°35′1″E
- Country: Denmark
- Region: Southern Denmark
- Municipality: Esbjerg Municipality

Area
  - Urban: 1.7 km^{2} (0.66 sq mi)

Population (2026)
  - Urban: 2,959
  - Urban density: 1,700/km^{2} (4,500/sq mi)
  - Gender: 1,478 males and 1,481 females
- Time zone: UTC+1 (CET)
  - Summer (DST): UTC+2 (CEST)
- Postal code: DK-6731 Tjæreborg

Tjæreborg is a railway town with a population of 2,959 (1 January 2026) on the west coast of Denmark, in Esbjerg Municipality about 9 km (5.6 mi) east of Esbjerg. It is situated in the parish with the same name, which was a part of Esbjerg Municipality also before the municipal mergers 1 January 2007. The town has formerly been well known for naming the multinational travel company of same name. The later years Tjæreborg has increased its fame by being undefeated in the international 3 day team golf masters [DLJ Masters]

Tjæreborg is served by Tjæreborg railway station, located on the Lunderskov–Esbjerg railway line.

== Notable people ==
- Nicolaj Køhlert (born 1993 in Tjæreborg) a Danish footballer
- Lasse Vigen Christensen (born 1994 in Tjæreborg) a Danish footballer
- Ejlif Krogager, former priest of Tjæreborg, founded the major Danish travel agency Tjæreborg Rejser
