= Vejen =

- town
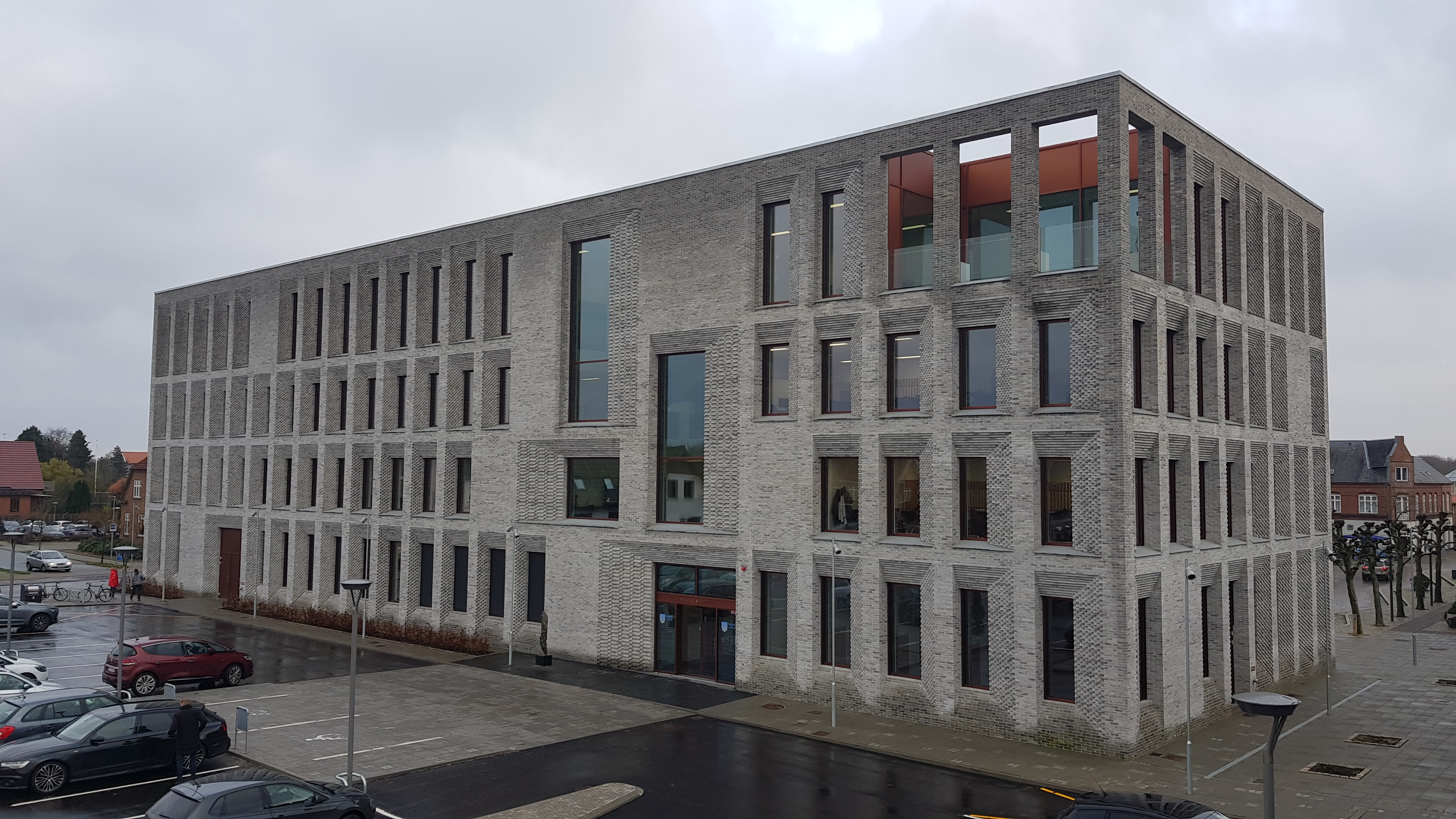
- Town hall of Vejen

- Location in Denmark Vejen (Region of Southern Denmark)
- Coordinates: 55.47736°N 9.13794°E
- Country: Denmark
- Region: Southern Denmark (Syddanmark)
- Municipality: Vejen

Area
  - Urban: 8.9 km^{2} (3.4 sq mi)

Population (2026)
  - Urban: 10,393
  - Urban density: 1,200/km^{2} (3,000/sq mi)
  - Gender: 5,045 males and 5,348 females
- Time zone: UTC+1 (CET)
  - Summer (DST): UTC+2 (CEST)
- Postal code: DK-6600 Vejen

Vejen is the main town in Vejen Municipality, Denmark, with a population of 10,393 (1 January 2026).

== Geography ==
The town is situated in the Danish region of Syddanmark between the cities of Kolding and Esbjerg. It is a railway town located at the railway line between Kolding and Esbjerg.

== Attractions ==
The Vejen Art Museum specializes in works from the end of the 19th century in styles including Symbolism and Art Nouveau.

== Economy ==
The food industry is a major employer. Major companies include Eurofins Steins Laboratorium, with 425 employees (2015), Danish Crown and Aquapris, a manufacturer of fish products.

== Transport ==
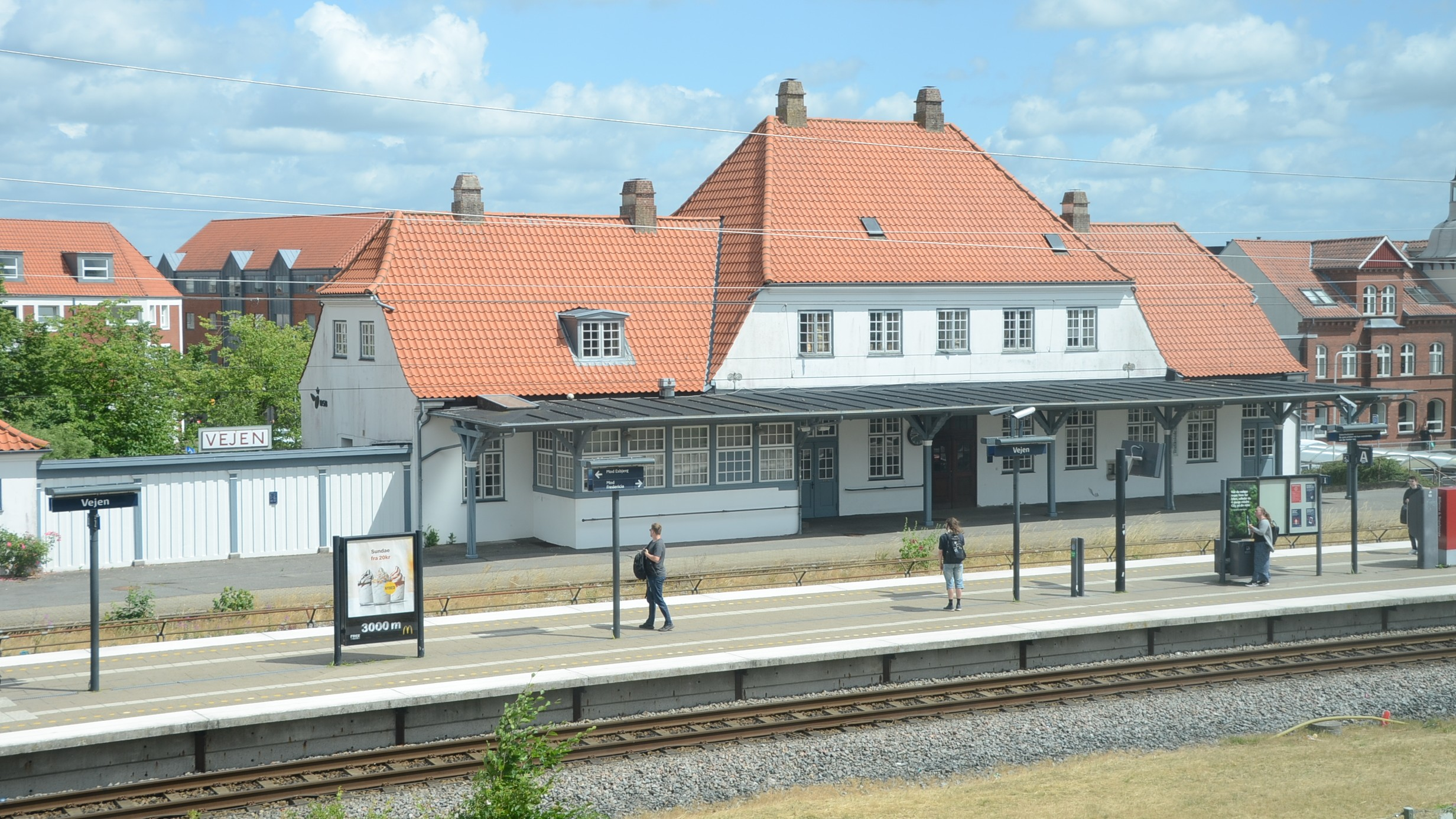
Vejen railway station in 2023.

Vejen is served by Vejen railway station, located on the Lunderskov–Esbjerg railway line. The station offers direct InterCity services to Copenhagen and Esbjerg as well as regional train services to Fredericia and Esbjerg.

== Notable people ==
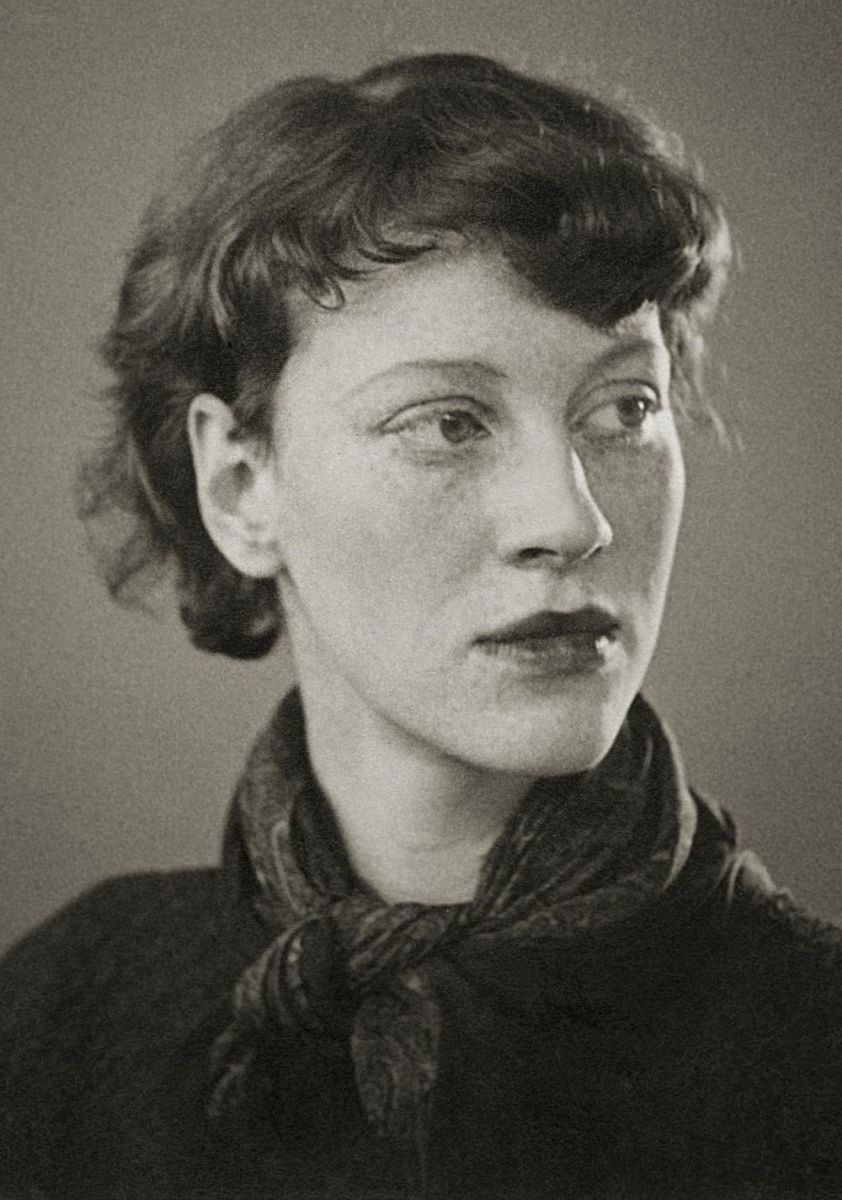
Ingrid Vang Nyman, ca.1935

- Niels Hansen Jacobsen (1861 in Vejen – 1941) a Danish sculptor and ceramist
- Peter Petersen (1892 in Vejen – 1964) a sports shooter, competed at the 1920 and 1924 Summer Olympics
- Arne Petersen (1913 in Vejen – 1990) a cyclist, competed in the 1936 Summer Olympics
- Ingrid Vang Nyman (1916 in Vejen – 1959) a Danish illustrator of the Pippi Longstocking books
- Andrea Elisabeth Rudolph (born 1976 in Vejen) a Danish TV and radio host
