= Lunderskov–Esbjerg railway line =

Railway line in Denmark

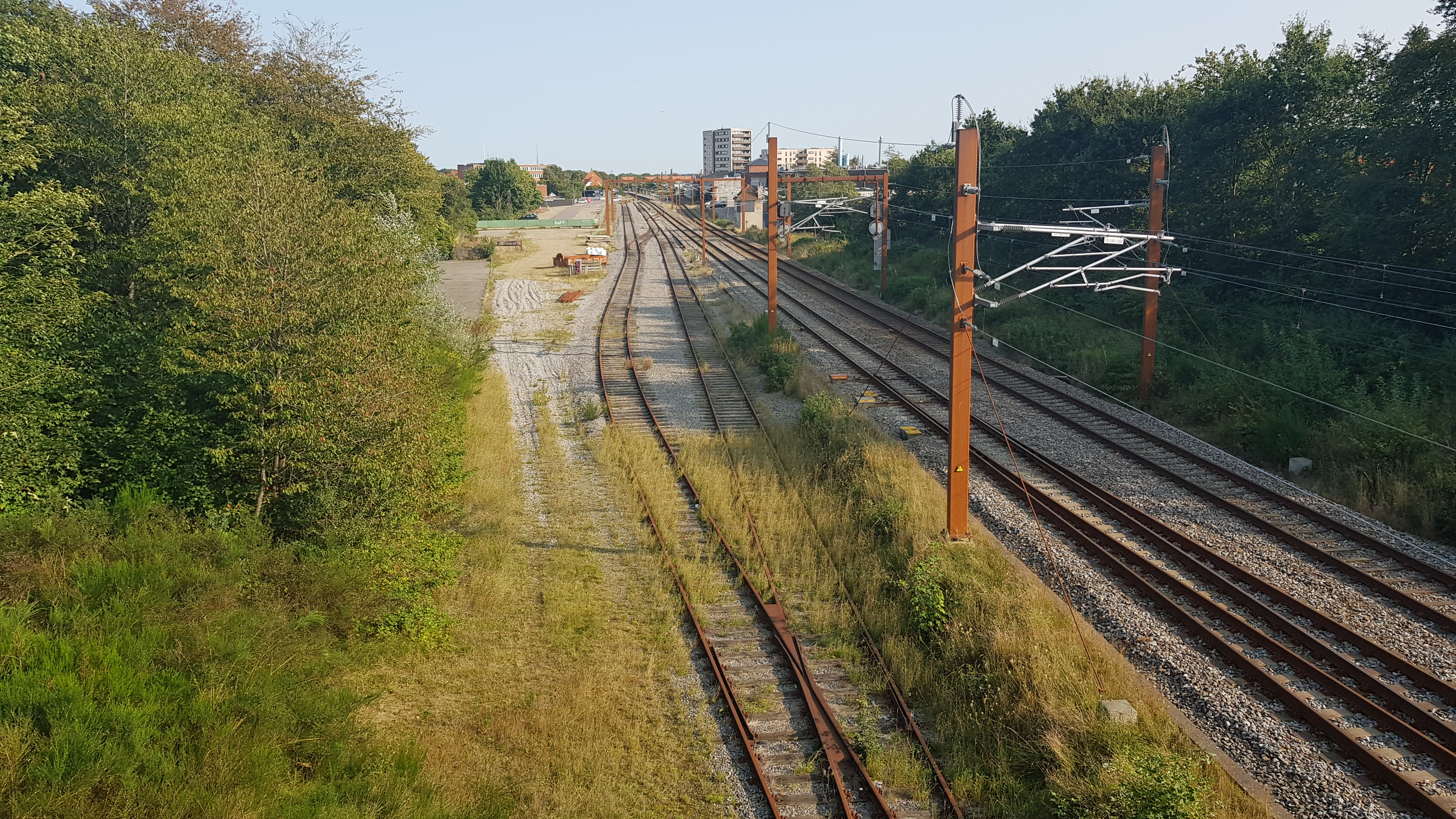
- The Lunderskov–Esbjerg railway line west of Vejen station in 2020

Overview
- Native name: Lunderskov-Esbjerg-banen
- Status: Operational
- Owner: Banedanmark
- Line number: 29
- Locale: Southern Jutland
- Termini: Lunderskov; Esbjerg
- Stations: 9

Service
- Type: Heavy rail
- System: Danish railway
- Operator(s): Danish State Railways; GoCollective

History
- Commenced: 24 April 1868
- Opened: 3 October 1874

Technical
- Line length: 55.7 km (34.6 mi)
- Number of tracks: Double track
- Character: Passenger trains Freight trains
- Track gauge: 1,435 mm (4 ft 8 1/2 in) standard gauge
- Electrification: 25 kV AC 50 Hz
- Operating speed: 180 km/h (110 mph)
The Lunderskov–Esbjerg railway line
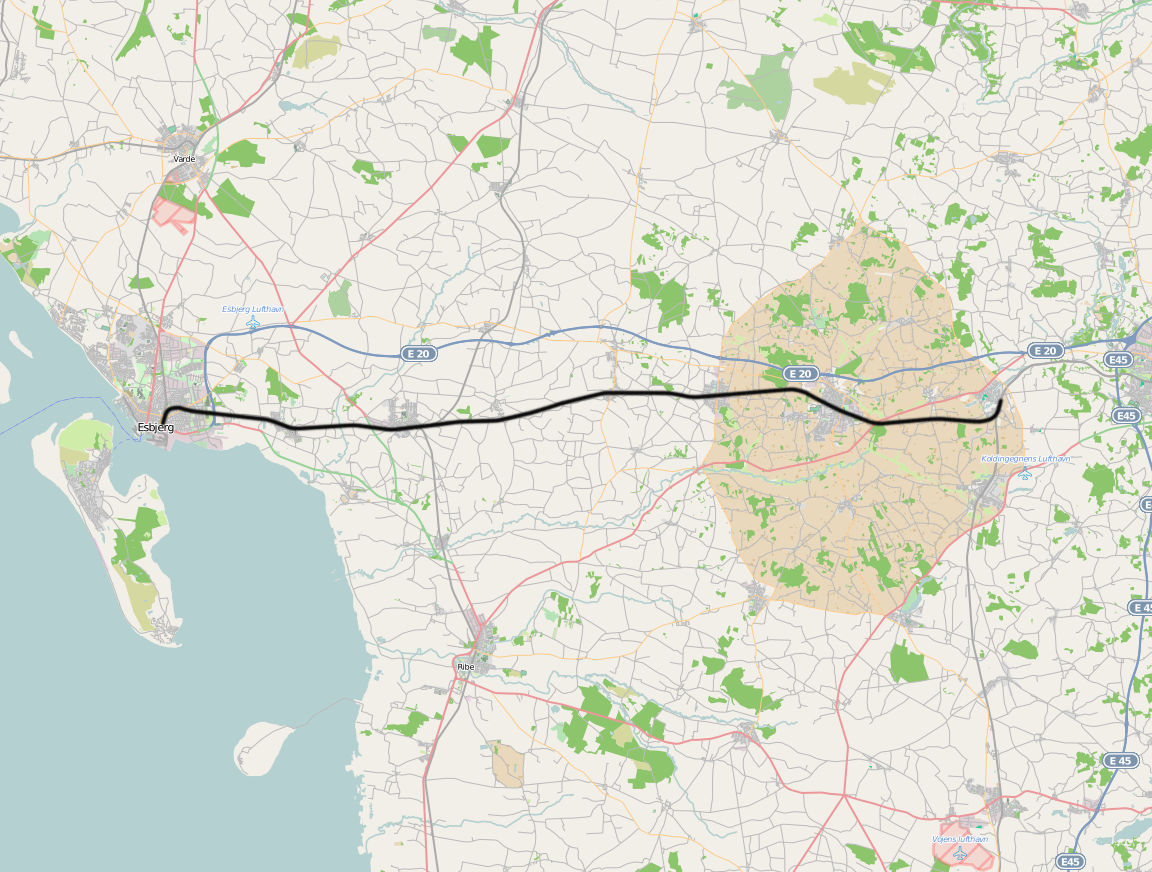
Map of the Lunderskov–Esbjerg railway line.

The Lunderskov-Esbjerg line is the railway between Lunderskov and Esbjerg in Southern Jutland. It was opened on 3 October 1874, along with the first part of the Esbjerg–Struer railway line to Varde.

== History ==
The construction of the line was authorised by a law of 24 April, 1868, together with the West Jutland longitudinal line, the Vendsyssel line and the Silkeborg line. On the same date, a law concerning the construction of the port of Esbjerg was also passed. In 1909, the railway bridge over Snæum river was destroyed by a 3 metres (10 ft) storm surge.

== Stations ==
- Lunderskov, starting point on the Fredericia–Padborg railway line
- former Andst station, closed as a station in 1969. The building is preserved at Stationsvej 16.
- Vejen, former connection to the Troldhede-Kolding-Vejen railway
- Brørup, only regional trains.
- Holsted, only regional trains.
- Gørding, only regional trains. Station building demolished in 2013.
- Bramming, connection with the Bramming–Tønder railway line and former connection to the Diagonal line to Grindsted (formerly on to Brande–Silkeborg–Randers).
- Tjæreborg, now only stopping for Arriva's Esbjerg-Tønder service. Station building demolished in 2002.
- Jerne, opened in 2020, only stopping for Arriva's Esbjerg-Tønder service
- Esbjerg, starting point for the West Jutland longitudinal line to Varde-Skjern-Holstebro

== Operation ==
From January 2003, the Esbjerg-Bramming section is operated by both Arriva and DSB, while the Bramming-Lunderskov section is only be operated by DSB with both Regional services to Aarhus and InterCity services to Copenhagen.

== Electrification ==
In the wake of the delay in the delivery of the scandal-ridden IC4 trains, it was proposed several times through the late '00s and early '10s to electrify the main line of the Danish railway network in order to be able to buy proven standard equipment to remedy the growing shortage of train equipment. However, this was rejected just as many times, as electrification of the railway network would require a simultaneous upgrading of the signaling system, which was already being replaced throughout the country by ERTMS 2.

In this context, the Esbjerg-Lunderskov section was interesting, because in 1997 the section had already been almost completely upgraded in preparation for a forthcoming electrification, just before the electrification program was cancelled. On 7 February 2012, the Social Democrats, the Radical Left, SF, Venstre, DF, Liberal Alliance and the Conservative People's Party therefore agreed to electrify the track, so it was ready for electric trains by the end of 2015.

The main idea behind the electrification was that it would allow for the rapid purchase of 15 new electric train sets, which could replace a similar number of IC3 train sets. To further secure the track for the future, it was subsequently decided, on 12 March 2013, by the same conciliation group to electrify the track with a system rated for 200 km/h (120 mph).

Electrification was later postponed to 2016 due to economies of scale, as the contractors could thereby go directly from this section to the other sections that were to be electrified subsequently. The electrification was begun on 6 August 2017, but was later hit by operational problems and a complete shutdown for electric trains, due to problems with the Siemens Sicat SX overhead distribution system. After a replacement of the faulty rope wheels, the track was reopened for electric operation on 13 August 2018.

== See also ==
- Rail transport in Denmark
- List of railway lines in Denmark
