= Lunderskov =

- Town
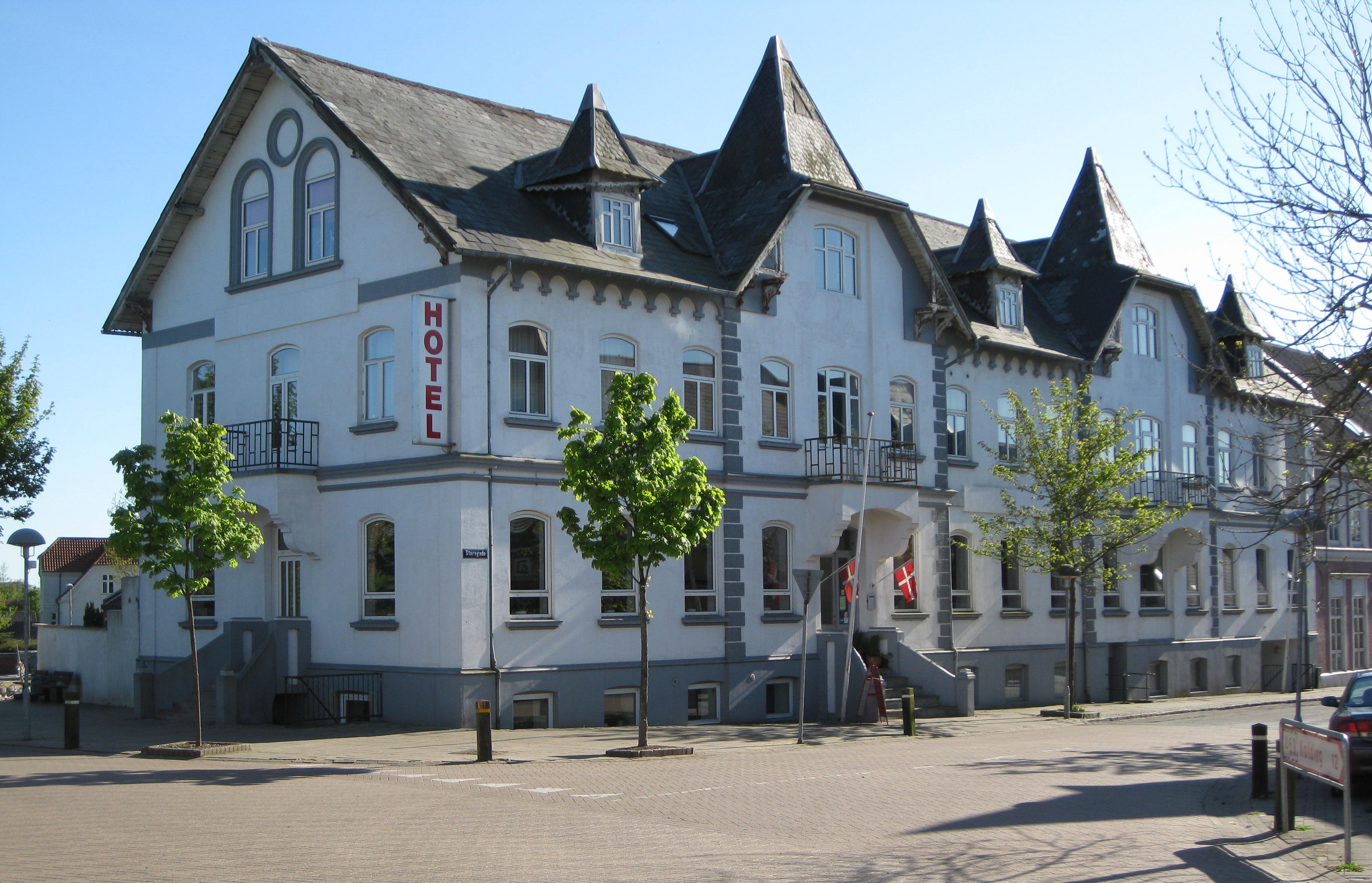
- Hotel Lunderskov

- Location in Denmark Lunderskov (Region of Southern Denmark)
- Coordinates: 55.483632°N 9.3002816°E
- Country: Denmark
- Region: Southern Denmark (Syddanmark)
- Municipality: Kolding

Area
  - Total: 3 km^{2} (1.2 sq mi)

Population (2026-01-01)
  - Total: 2,963
  - Density: 990/km^{2} (2,600/sq mi)
- Time zone: UTC+1 (CET)
  - Summer (DST): UTC+2 (CEST)
- Postal code: DK-6640 Lunderskov

Lunderskov is a railway town, with a population of 2,963 (1 January 2026), in Kolding Municipality, Region of Southern Denmark in Denmark. It is situated 13 km west of Kolding, 8 km north of Vamdrup and 12 km east of Vejen.

Lunderskov was the municipal seat of the former Lunderskov Municipality until 1 January 2007.

Drabæks Mølle is a former watermill located in the northern part of Lunderskov. Drabæks Mølle is the oldest business, driven under the same name since ca. 1100. It was closed in 2008 and is now a private residential property.

== Transportation ==
Lunderskov is served by Lunderskov railway station, an important railway junction located where the Lunderskov–Esbjerg railway line is connected with the Fredericia–Padborg railway line.

== Gallery ==
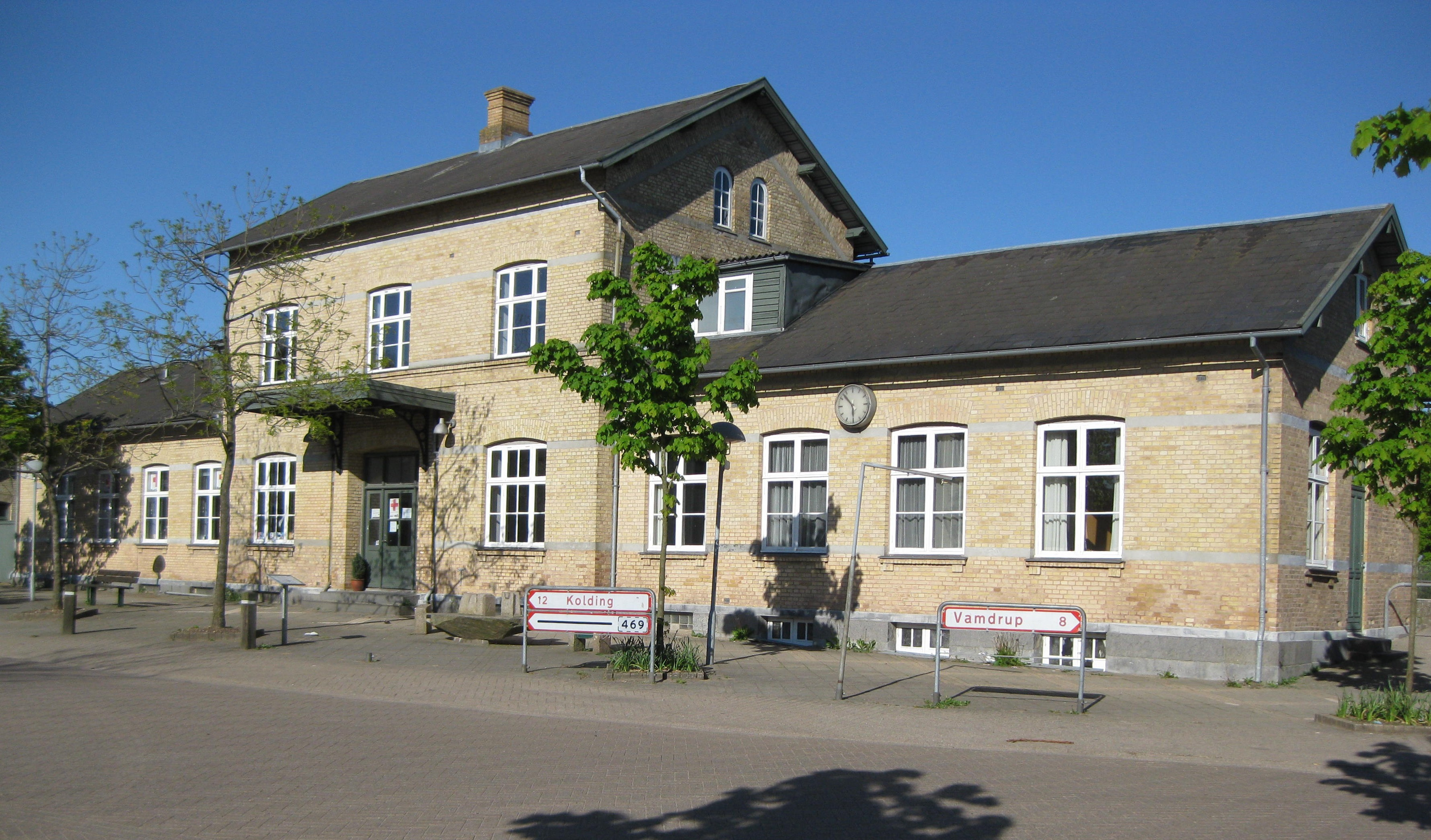
Lunderskov train station building

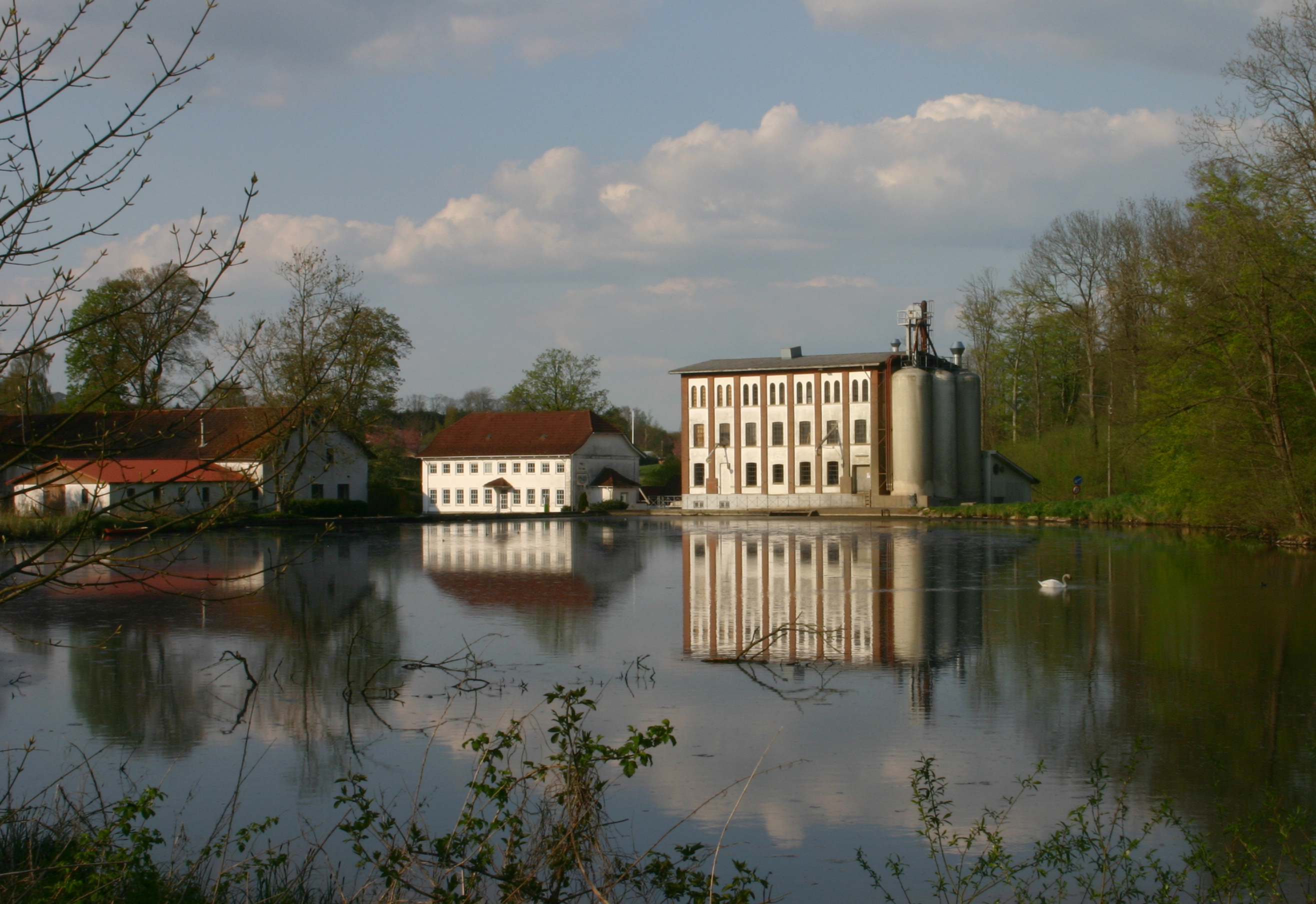
Drabæks Mølle (English: Drabaek Mill)

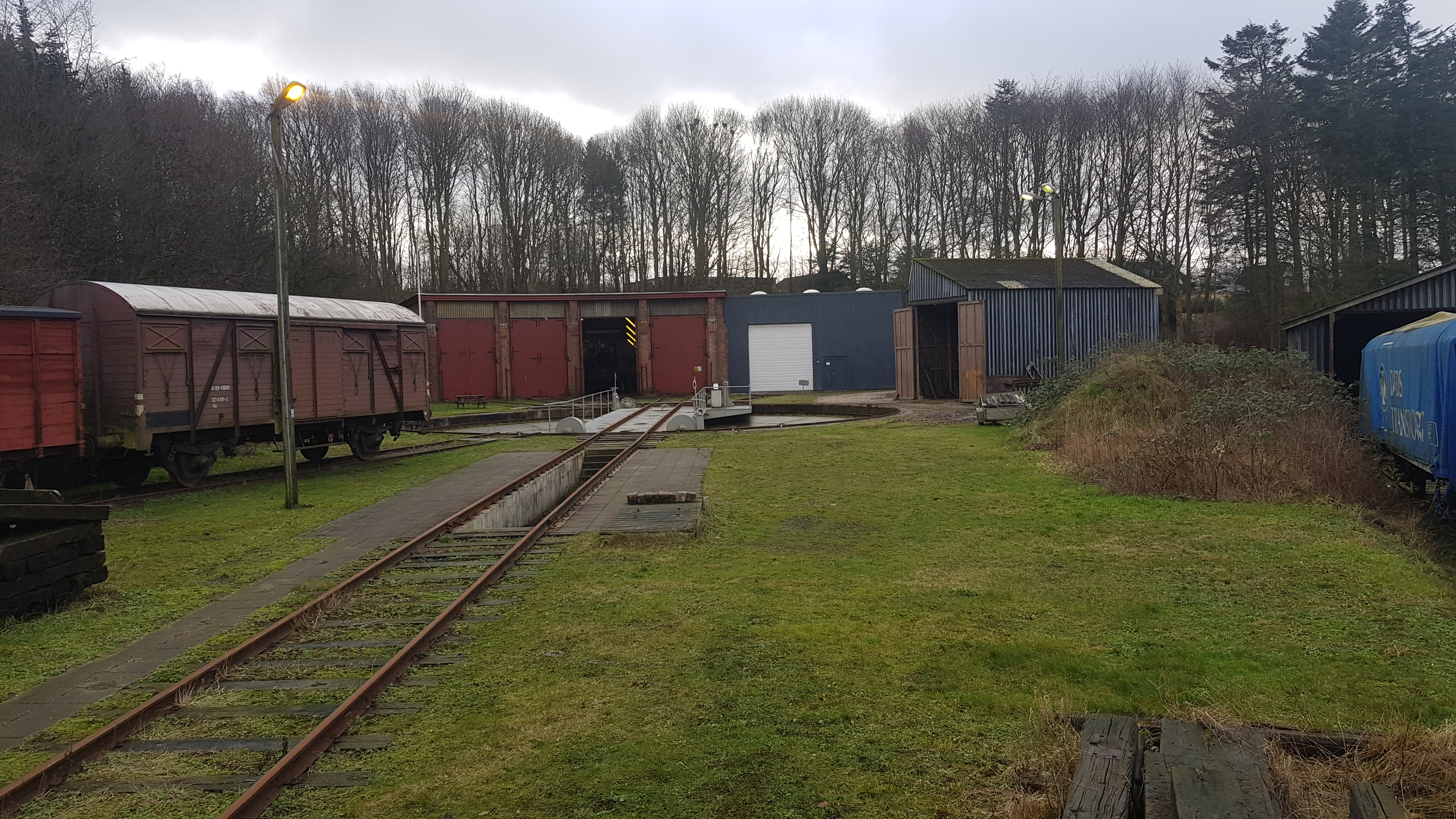
Lunderskov Remise
