= 2025 Varde municipal election =

Municipal election in Denmark

← 2021	18 November 2025	2029 →

All 25 seats to the Varde municipal council 13 seats needed for a majority
- Turnout: 26,971 (68.9%) ▲0.5%
	First party	Second party	Third party
	V	A	C
Party	Venstre	Social Democrats	Conservatives
Last election	10 seats, 39.1%	6 seats, 20.6%	5 seats, 16.3%
Seats won	11	4	2
Seat change	▲1	▼2	▼3
Popular vote	9,885	4,394	2,304
Percentage	37.3%	16.6%	8.7%
Swing	▼1.8%	▼4.0%	▼7.6%
	Fourth party	Fifth party	Sixth party
	Æ	I	F
Party	Denmark Democrats	Liberal Alliance	Green Left
Last election	Did not stand	0 seats, 0.7%	1 seat, 3.1%
Seats won	2	2	2
Seat change	▲2	▲2	▲1
Popular vote	2,086	2,066	1,852
Percentage	7.9%	7.8%	7.0%
Swing	New	▲7.1%	▲3.9%
	Seventh party	Eighth party	Ninth party
	N	O	K
Party	NÆRdemokraterne	Danish People's Party	Christian Democrats
Last election	Did not stand	1 seat, 4.5%	1 seat, 3.2%
Seats won	1	1	0
Seat change	▲1	0	▼1
Popular vote	1,773	1,495	101
Percentage	6.7%	5.6%	0.4%
Swing	New	▲1.1%	▼2.9%
Mayor before election
Mads Sørensen
Venstre
Mayor after election
Sarah Andersen
Venstre

The 2025 Varde Municipal election was held on November 18, 2025, to elect the 25 members to sit in the regional council for the Varde Municipal council, in the period of 2026 to 2029. Sarah Andersen from Venstre, would win the mayoral position.

== Background ==
Following the 2021 election, Mads Sørensen from Venstre became mayor for his first term. However, he does not intend to run for re-election. Instead, Sarah Andersen will be the mayoral candidate from Venstre. The party will seek to hold onto the mayoral position in the municipality, a position they've held since 1966. Throughout the ongoing period, a new party had also been established, called NÆRdemokraterne. They had 3 seats at a point, and ran in this election, winning 1 seat.

== Electoral system ==
For elections to Danish municipalities, a number varying from 9 to 31 are chosen to be elected to the municipal council. The seats are then allocated using the D'Hondt method and a closed list proportional representation. Varde Municipality had 25 seats in 2025.

== Electoral alliances ==
=== Electoral Alliance 1 ===
Party		Political alignment
A	Social Democrats	Centre-left
B	Social Liberals	Centre to Centre-left
F	Green Left	Centre-left to Left-wing

=== Electoral Alliance 2 ===
Party		Political alignment
C	Conservatives	Centre-right
I	Liberal Alliance	Centre-right to Right-wing
K	Christian Democrats	Centre to Centre-right
Æ	Denmark Democrats	Right-wing to Far-right

=== Electoral Alliance 3 ===
Party		Political alignment
M	Moderates	Centre to Centre-right
O	Danish People's Party	Right-wing to Far-right
V	Venstre	Centre-right

== Results by polling station ==
Division	A	B	C	F	I	K	M	N	O	V	Æ
Division	%	%	%	%	%	%	%	%	%	%	%
Varde By	23.1	1.8	6.3	8.2	5.9	0.2	1.3	5.7	6.0	35.3	6.2
Sig	20.4	1.4	4.5	6.8	4.8	0.0	0.6	4.6	4.9	43.5	8.5
Billum	11.6	1.5	19.5	13.4	17.8	0.0	0.7	1.8	8.3	18.0	7.5
Tinghøj	14.4	1.3	6.0	7.8	4.1	0.0	0.6	5.6	6.9	37.1	16.2
Alslev	18.7	1.6	7.8	8.6	8.1	0.1	1.4	8.4	5.9	32.5	7.0
Horne Hallen	11.8	0.7	0.8	2.9	2.2	0.5	0.2	2.7	4.2	65.1	8.9
Janderup	35.7	0.5	8.3	4.2	7.3	0.1	0.3	3.8	4.1	27.0	8.7
Lunde	12.0	1.0	5.0	13.2	8.0	0.2	0.5	4.2	8.3	33.2	14.5
Nørre Nebel	18.8	1.4	6.3	7.3	13.8	0.8	0.9	3.1	6.9	30.3	10.6
Henne	14.6	1.0	9.4	9.2	6.5	2.0	1.0	4.2	5.5	36.2	10.4
Outrup	15.2	0.4	12.4	6.4	6.3	0.6	0.4	2.8	7.3	37.3	10.9
Oksbøl	11.4	1.0	35.8	7.8	18.3	0.1	0.7	5.3	5.3	10.2	4.1
Blåvand	11.4	0.0	43.8	6.0	16.8	0.0	1.0	2.5	5.4	10.2	2.9
Årre	10.2	0.6	2.0	4.2	4.7	0.0	0.3	4.4	7.0	56.6	10.0
Agerbæk	8.4	0.8	7.1	4.0	30.2	0.1	0.3	1.4	4.2	37.4	6.2
Fåborg	7.2	1.2	4.9	6.9	9.2	0.3	0.0	4.9	4.9	50.3	10.1
Næsbjerg	22.3	0.4	17.2	11.3	3.8	0.2	0.2	2.7	3.6	28.5	9.9
Starup Multihus	7.7	0.5	1.8	2.3	2.8	0.5	0.2	1.8	5.7	73.8	2.8
Nordenskov	13.2	0.4	4.2	6.3	4.4	0.0	0.8	6.0	7.7	45.1	11.9
Ølgod	11.7	1.7	2.4	5.2	3.7	1.3	0.4	12.3	5.3	47.0	9.1
Tistrup	16.3	0.6	2.5	5.7	3.7	0.1	0.1	3.7	5.4	53.0	9.1
Ansager	6.6	0.6	1.1	3.9	2.9	0.4	0.1	22.6	2.8	52.2	6.8
Skovlund	5.1	1.2	1.6	5.1	4.4	1.2	0.2	36.2	3.3	31.3	10.3

== Results ==
Party		Votes	%	+/-	Seats	+/-
Varde Municipality
V	Venstre	9,885	37.34	-1.76	11	+1
A	Social Democrats	4,394	16.60	-4.03	4	-2
C	Conservatives	2,304	8.70	-7.63	2	-3
Æ	Denmark Democrats	2,086	7.88	New	2	New
I	Liberal Alliance	2,066	7.80	+7.14	2	+2
F	Green Left	1,852	7.00	+3.89	2	+1
N	NÆRdemokraterne	1,773	6.70	New	1	New
O	Danish People's Party	1,495	5.65	+1.13	1	0
B	Social Liberals	324	1.22	-1.80	0	0
M	Moderates	195	0.74	New	0	New
K	Christian Democrats	101	0.38	-2.85	0	-1
Total		26,475	100	N/A	25	N/A
Invalid votes		85	0.22	-0.13		
Blank votes		411	1.05	+0.20		
Turnout		26,971	68.92	+0.51		
Source: valg.dk

== Opinion polls ==
Polling firm	Fieldwork date	Sample size	V	A	C	O	K	F	B	I	M	N	Æ	Others	Lead
Epinion	4 Sep - 13 Oct 2025	500	34.5	21.8	5.4	7.8	–	5.5	1.7	5.5	1.2	–	12.0	4.5	12.7
2024 european parliament election	9 Jun 2024		28.7	14.3	8.6	7.8	–	8.7	2.9	6.7	4.6	–	14.6	–	14.1
2022 general election	1 Nov 2022		23.2	24.2	5.2	2.6	0.9	4.0	1.5	6.8	8.4	–	14.2	–	1.0
2021 regional election	16 Nov 2021		51.6	21.1	7.8	4.0	1.9	3.0	2.3	0.8	–	–	–	–	30.5
2021 municipal election	16 Nov 2021		39.1 (10)	20.6 (6)	16.3 (5)	4.5 (1)	3.2 (1)	3.1 (1)	3.0 (0)	0.7 (0)	–	–	–	–	18.5
