= 2021 Varde municipal election =

← 2017	16 November 2021	2025 →

All 25 seats to the Varde Municipal Council 13 seats needed for a majority
- Turnout: 26,944 (68.4%) ▼4.0pp
	First party	Second party	Third party
	V	A	C
Party	Venstre	Social Democrats	Conservatives
Last election	12 seats, 42.0%	6 seats, 18.9%	1 seat, 6.8%
Seats won	10	6	5
Seat change	▼2	0	▲4
Popular vote	10,351	5,461	4,325
Percentage	39.1%	20.6%	16.3%
Swing	▼2.9%	▲1.7%	▲9.5%
	Fourth party	Fifth party	Sixth party
	D	O	K
Party	New Right	Danish People's Party	Christian Democrats
Last election	Did Not Stand	2 seats, 10.3%	0 seats, 0.5%
Seats won	1	1	1
Seat change	▲1	▼1	▲1
Popular vote	1,220	1,196	856
Percentage	4.6%	4.5%	3.2%
Swing	New	▼5.8%	▲2.7%
	Seventh party	Eighth party	Ninth party
	F	B	L
Party	Green Left	Social Liberals	Lokallisten 2017
Last election	0 seats, 1.9%	1 seat, 3.7%	2 seats, 8.7%
Seats won	1	0	0
Seat change	▲1	▼1	▼2
Popular vote	821	800	284
Percentage	3.1%	3.0%	1.1%
Swing	▲1.2%	▼0.7%	▼7.6%
Mayor before election
Erik Buhl
Venstre
Mayor after election
Mads Sørensen
Venstre

Varde was the municipality where the traditional blue bloc got the 4th highest % of vote share in the 2019 Danish general election. Venstre had won a majority of seats in 2009 and 2013, but had come one short in 2017, although they still had managed to find a majority that would support them holding the mayor position.

In 2020, Erik Buhl Nielsen from Venstre, who had been mayor for the last 2 terms, announced that would not stand for a third term. Instead Mads Sørensen would be the candidate from Venstre. He would succeed in being elected for the mayor position, despite Venstre losing 2 seats, and thus receiving their worst election result since the 2007 municipal reform. The traditional blue bloc itself would gain 2 seats.

The Christian Democrats would win its first seat in the municipality since the 2007 municipal reform, and it would be the only seat they would win in a municipality from the South Jutland constituency.

== Electoral system ==
For elections to Danish municipalities, a number varying from 9 to 31 are chosen to be elected to the municipal council. The seats are then allocated using the D'Hondt method and a closed list proportional representation. Varde Municipality had 25 seats in 2021

Unlike in Danish General Elections, in elections to municipal councils, electoral alliances are allowed.

== Electoral alliances ==
=== Electoral Alliance 1 ===
Party		Political alignment
A	Social Democrats	Centre-left
B	Social Liberals	Centre to Centre-left

=== Electoral Alliance 2 ===
Party		Political alignment
E	E-Borgergruppen	Local politics
L	Lokallisten 2017	Local politics

=== Electoral Alliance 3 ===
Party		Political alignment
F	Green Left	Centre-left to Left-wing
Ø	Red–Green Alliance	Left-wing to Far-Left

=== Electoral Alliance 4 ===
Party		Political alignment
C	Conservatives	Centre-right
D	New Right	Right-wing to Far-right
I	Liberal Alliance	Centre-right to Right-wing
K	Christian Democrats	Centre to Centre-right
O	Danish People's Party	Right-wing to Far-right

== Results by polling station ==
E = E-Borgergruppen
U = Udviklingslisten

Division	A	B	C	D	E	F	I	K	L	O	U	V	Ø
Division	%	%	%	%	%	%	%	%	%	%	%	%	%
Varde By	28.7	2.8	14.9	4.2	2.0	3.6	0.9	2.7	0.3	5.1	4.4	29.3	1.1
Sig	20.2	1.6	11.1	2.5	1.2	5.1	0.1	1.7	0.4	3.6	1.3	50.4	0.7
Billum	20.8	1.6	25.6	8.6	1.1	4.1	0.5	2.5	0.7	5.2	0.0	28.3	1.1
Tinghøj	16.0	2.9	16.0	4.0	4.8	2.5	0.6	2.7	0.4	4.0	2.7	42.9	0.2
Lunde	16.7	1.3	9.5	9.5	1.4	6.2	1.9	4.3	1.3	7.5	0.3	39.4	0.8
Janderup	18.9	4.1	20.5	7.0	0.9	5.4	1.5	3.0	0.8	5.0	0.7	31.1	1.1
Alslev	24.7	1.4	8.5	5.2	1.8	2.6	0.2	1.1	0.1	5.1	1.2	47.3	0.8
Nørre Nebel	22.4	1.9	14.4	4.3	3.4	4.3	0.7	1.8	0.8	6.0	0.2	38.3	1.6
Henne	18.6	2.7	21.1	6.3	2.5	6.1	0.7	4.3	0.0	3.2	0.5	32.9	1.1
Outrup	19.1	2.0	16.0	4.9	1.2	1.8	0.5	2.6	1.1	6.0	1.1	42.9	0.8
Oksbøl	15.4	1.4	47.7	5.1	0.8	3.0	0.5	1.0	0.4	3.4	0.2	20.2	0.9
Fåborg	11.8	3.8	12.1	3.8	0.3	1.9	0.0	1.9	0.5	7.4	0.0	54.4	1.9
Agerbæk	11.9	12.4	7.8	3.5	0.2	2.2	0.6	2.8	0.7	4.6	0.0	52.6	0.8
Årre	14.7	3.1	6.0	7.1	0.5	1.7	0.8	0.9	0.5	4.6	0.0	59.5	0.6
Blåvand	16.7	1.2	49.2	1.5	0.3	1.8	0.3	0.3	0.0	4.9	0.3	21.6	1.8
Næsbjerg	33.2	2.9	19.0	4.9	0.6	3.2	0.8	3.5	0.9	4.2	0.3	25.9	0.6
Starup	9.1	20.3	3.9	4.6	0.2	1.0	0.7	2.9	0.7	3.4	0.0	53.0	0.2
Nordenskov	16.9	3.4	14.8	4.5	2.2	2.9	0.5	1.2	1.4	6.2	0.4	44.5	1.0
Ølgod	16.7	1.8	7.9	3.9	0.3	2.7	0.6	9.1	1.2	3.6	0.2	51.2	0.7
Skovlund	8.5	3.5	30.3	6.1	0.7	1.7	0.4	3.9	3.9	2.2	0.2	37.7	0.9
Ansager	11.0	1.5	15.7	4.5	0.2	0.8	0.3	5.1	10.1	2.1	0.0	48.0	0.7
Tistrup	20.4	1.9	8.5	3.6	0.3	2.0	0.3	1.6	1.2	3.8	0.2	55.9	0.5
Horne	17.1	1.2	5.0	3.0	0.7	1.5	0.2	2.2	1.7	3.3	0.2	64.0	0.2

== Results ==
Party		Votes	%	+/-	Seats	+/-
Varde Municipality
V	Venstre	10,351	39.10	-2.91	10	-2
A	Social Democrats	5,461	20.63	+1.74	6	0
C	Conservatives	4,325	16.34	+9.53	5	+4
D	New Right	1,220	4.61	New	1	New
O	Danish People's Party	1,196	4.52	-5.77	1	-1
K	Christian Democrats	856	3.23	+2.76	1	+1
F	Green Left	821	3.10	+1.16	1	+1
B	Social Liberals	800	3.02	-0.72	0	-1
U	Udviklingslisten	397	1.50	New	0	New
E	E-Borgergruppen	346	1.31	New	0	New
L	Lokallisten 2017	284	1.07	-7.65	0	-2
Ø	Red-Green Alliance	240	0.91	-1.69	0	0
I	Liberal Alliance	177	0.67	-3.26	0	-1
Total		26,474	100	N/A	25	N/A
Invalid votes		138	0.35	+0.08		
Blank votes		332	0.84	+0.06		
Turnout		26,944	68.42	-4.00		
Source: valg.dk
