= Gårde railway station =

Railway station in West Jutland, Denmark

Gårde
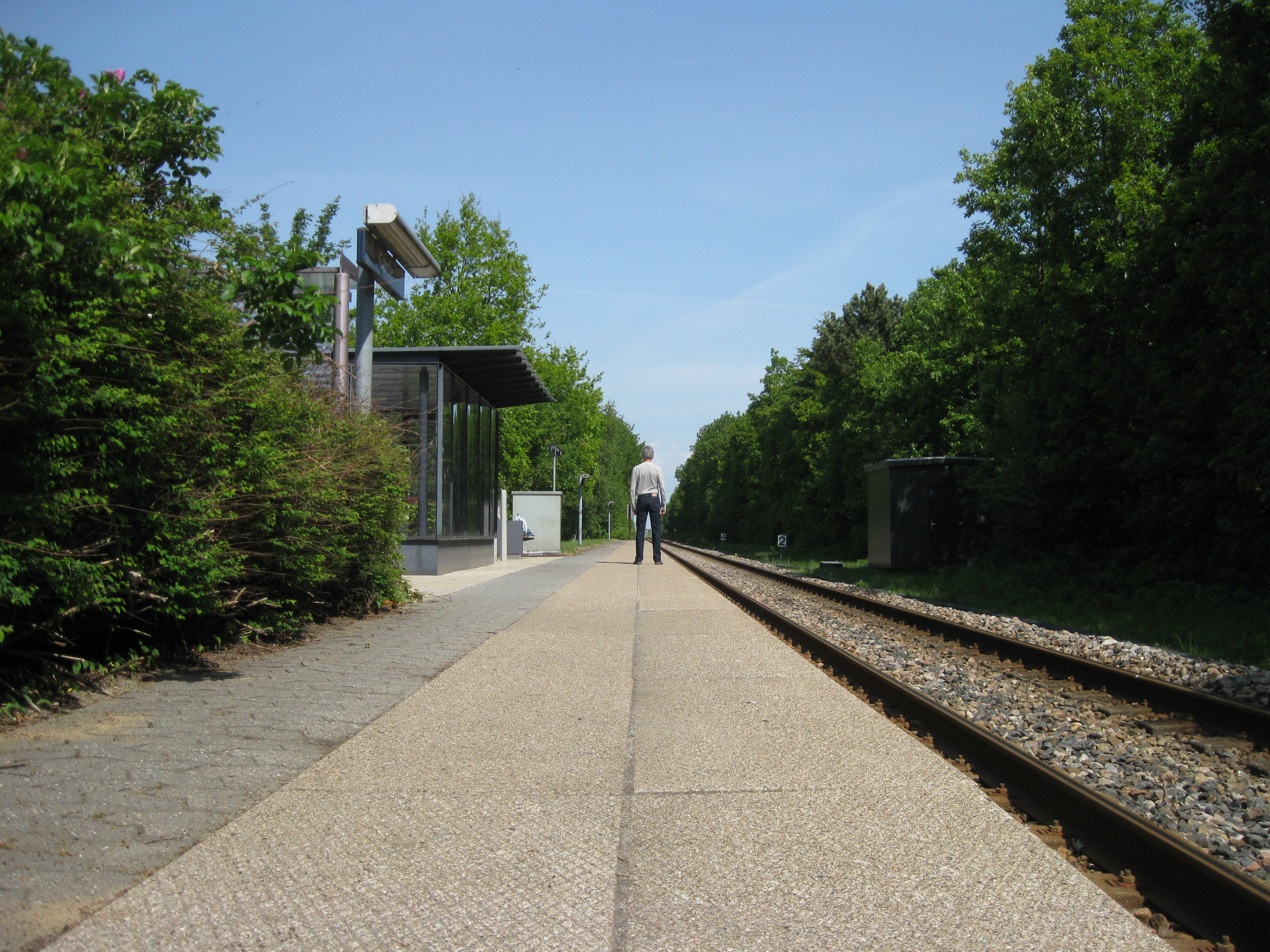
- Gårde station in 2011

General information
- Location: Stationsbakken 24, Gårde; 6870 Ølgod; Varde Municipality; Denmark
- Coordinates: 55°45′56″N 8°36′42″E
- Elevation: 41.8 metres (137 ft)
- Owner: Banedanmark
- Line: Esbjerg-Struer railway line
- Platforms: 1
- Tracks: 1
- Train operators: GoCollective

History
- Opened: 1878

Services
Preceding station	GoCollective	Following station
Tistrup towards Esbjerg	Esbjerg–Skjern Regional train	Ølgod towards Skjern
Location

Gårde station is a railway station serving the settlement of Gårde near Ølgod in West Jutland, Denmark.

Gårde station is located on the Esbjerg–Struer railway line from Esbjerg to Struer. The station opened in 1878. It offers regional rail services to Aarhus, Esbjerg, Herning and Skjern, operated by the private public transport company GoCollective.

== History ==
The station opened in 1878 as a railway halt with ticket sales on the Esbjerg–Struer railway line, which had opened three years before. It was promoted to a station in 1920. It has been unstaffed since 1970.

== Services ==
The station offers direct regional rail services to Esbjerg, Skjern, Herning and Aarhus, operated by the private public transport operating company GoCollective.

== See also ==
- List of railway stations in Denmark
- Rail transport in Denmark
