= Inter Primo =

Danish company

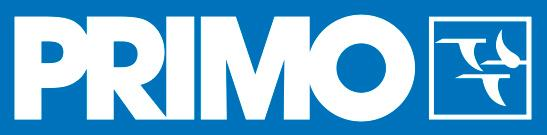
- Type: Aktieselskab
- Industry: Plastic, extrusion, bioplastics, polymers
- Founded: 1959
- Headquarters: Copenhagen, Denmark
- Key people: Fleming Grunnet (Chairman of the Board); Claus Tønnesen (President & CEO)
- Products: Extruded plastic profiles
- Revenue: DKK 1.02 billion (2019)
- Number of employees: 894 (2019)
- Website: www.primo.com

Inter Primo A/S is a Danish multinational plastic extrusion company headquartered in central Copenhagen, Denmark, with 14 production facilities in eight countries and an additional office in Norway. Inter Primo is controlled by Primo Holding A/S.

Inter Primo manufactures plastic profiles for a range of industries, including medico, offshore, building, transport, and lighting.

Inter Primo employs 894 people in Europe and China and markets its products globally. The corporation is a result of more than 20 mergers and acquisitions since Inter Primo was established in 1959 in Tistrup, Denmark.

The company is owned by Primo Holding A/S, which is owned by three other holding companies, D. Grunnet Holding A/S, F. Grunnet Holding A/S, and M. Grunnet Holding A/S, owned by the chairman of the board Fleming Grunnet and his two daughters Mette and Dorthe.

== History ==
=== 1959 ===
Primo is established in Tistrup Denmark by entrepreneur Chresten Jensen. The company's plastic profiles were sold to hardware stores and lumber yards.

=== 1977 ===
Chresten Jensen sells his share of the company to Fleming Grunnet. Primo takes over the two companies Ureflex and Krone Plast, both located in Denmark.

=== 1984 ===
Primo takes over Swedish Kontraplast AB – Primo's first investment abroad – and establishes Primo Sweden AB. In the following years, Primo buys the Swedish plastic manufacturer Sondex and the Finnish OY WH Profil AB – a subsidiary to KWH Group – and thus establishes OY Primo Finland AB with Roger Häggblom as managing director.

=== 1986 ===
Inter Primo is founded. Primo UK is established the next year in Manchester, England.

=== 1990 ===
Primo buys two German profile manufacturers and establishes Primo Profile GmbH in Germany.

=== 1995 ===
OY Primo Finland acquires a competing company and becomes Finland's dominating profile manufacturers in the coming years. The same year Primo UK shuts down all activities due to a lack of success on the British market.

=== 1996 ===
Primo Sweden buys Smålandslisten AB, which produces silicone mouldings. Primo builds a new factory in Zory, Poland – Primo's first factory built from scratch. The Polish subsidiary Primo Profile Sp. Z o.o. is established and takes over the profile production from Spyra-Primo.

=== 1997 ===
Primo takes over Vefi Profiler AS in Norway.

=== 2000 ===
Inter Primo establish headquarters in Vestergade in Copenhagen, Denmark. Primo Danmark acquires the plastic division for windows from Rationel Vinduer A/S.

=== 2004 ===
Primo Profile GmbH opens a new factory in Berlin, Germany, and establishes a joint venture with German Profilex and buys a 25 pct. share of Profilex China in Zhuhai, Kina. The year before Primo acquired the Danish extrusion company OTV Plast A/S.

=== 2005 ===
Primo Finland initiates production in St. Petersburg, Russia. Swedish production is gathered in a new factory in Limmared in Västra Götaland.

=== 2019 ===
Primo buys Essentra Extrusion in Buitenpost, the Netherlands for 16.2 million euros and establishes itself in the Netherlands under the name of Enitor Primo. The company celebrates its 60 years anniversary.
