= Hjedding Dairy Museum =

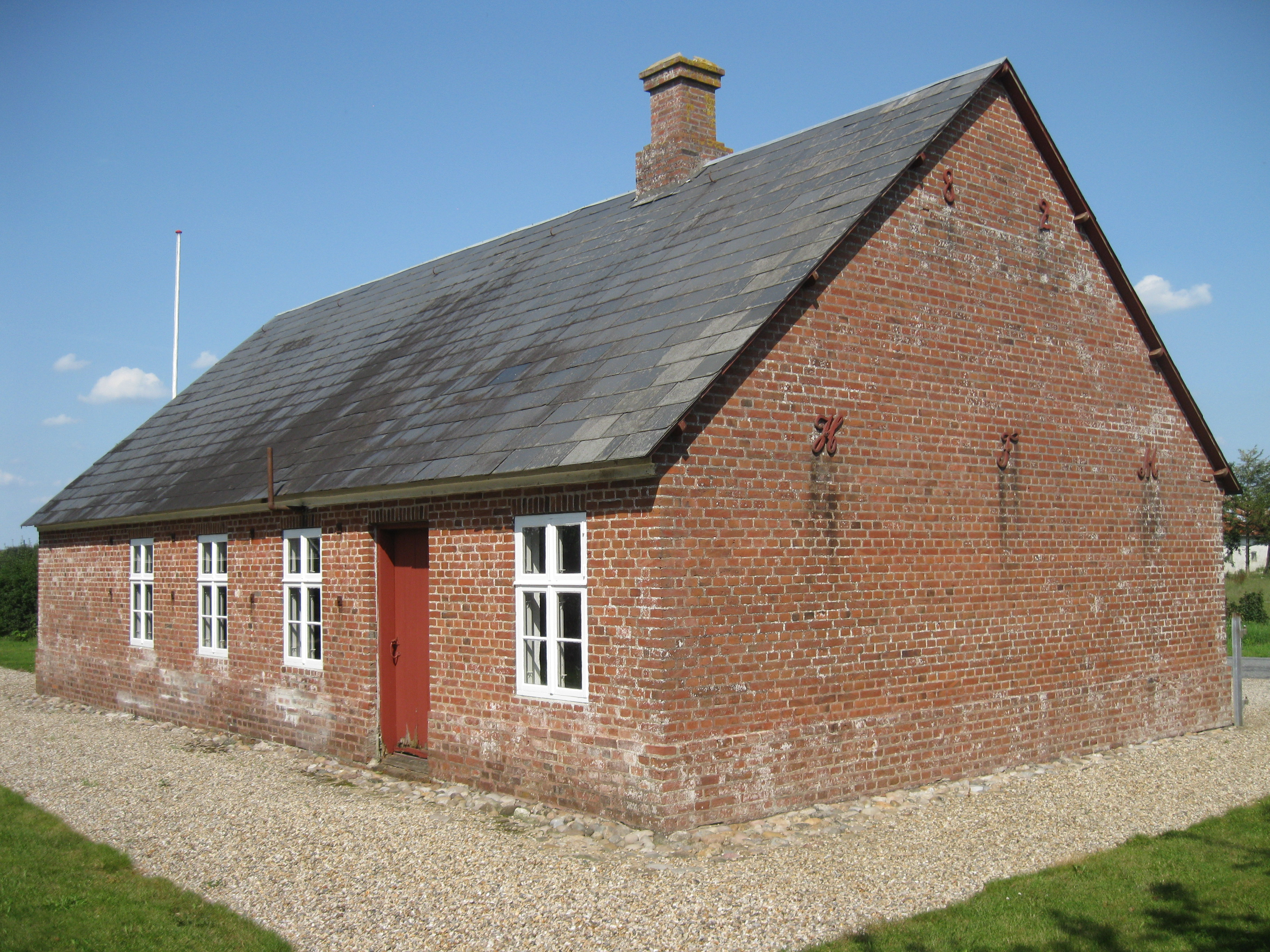
Hjedding Dairy.

Hjedding Cooperative Dairy (Danish: Hjedding Andelsmejeri), situated close to Ølgod, Varde Municipality, was Denmark's first cooperative dairy. It is now operated as a museum.

== History ==
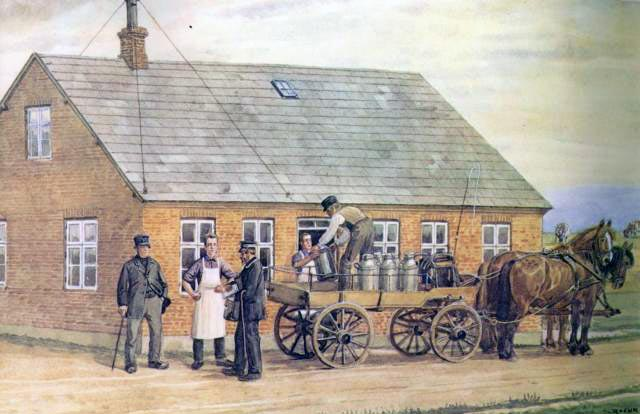
Hjeding Cooperative Dairy-

Hjeding Cooperative Dairy was founded by local dairy farmers on 10 June 1882. In 1905. it was moved to Ølgod. In 1948, its original building was converted into a museum.
