= Helle Municipality =

Former municipality of Denmark

Coordinates: 55°34′22″N 8°39′48″E

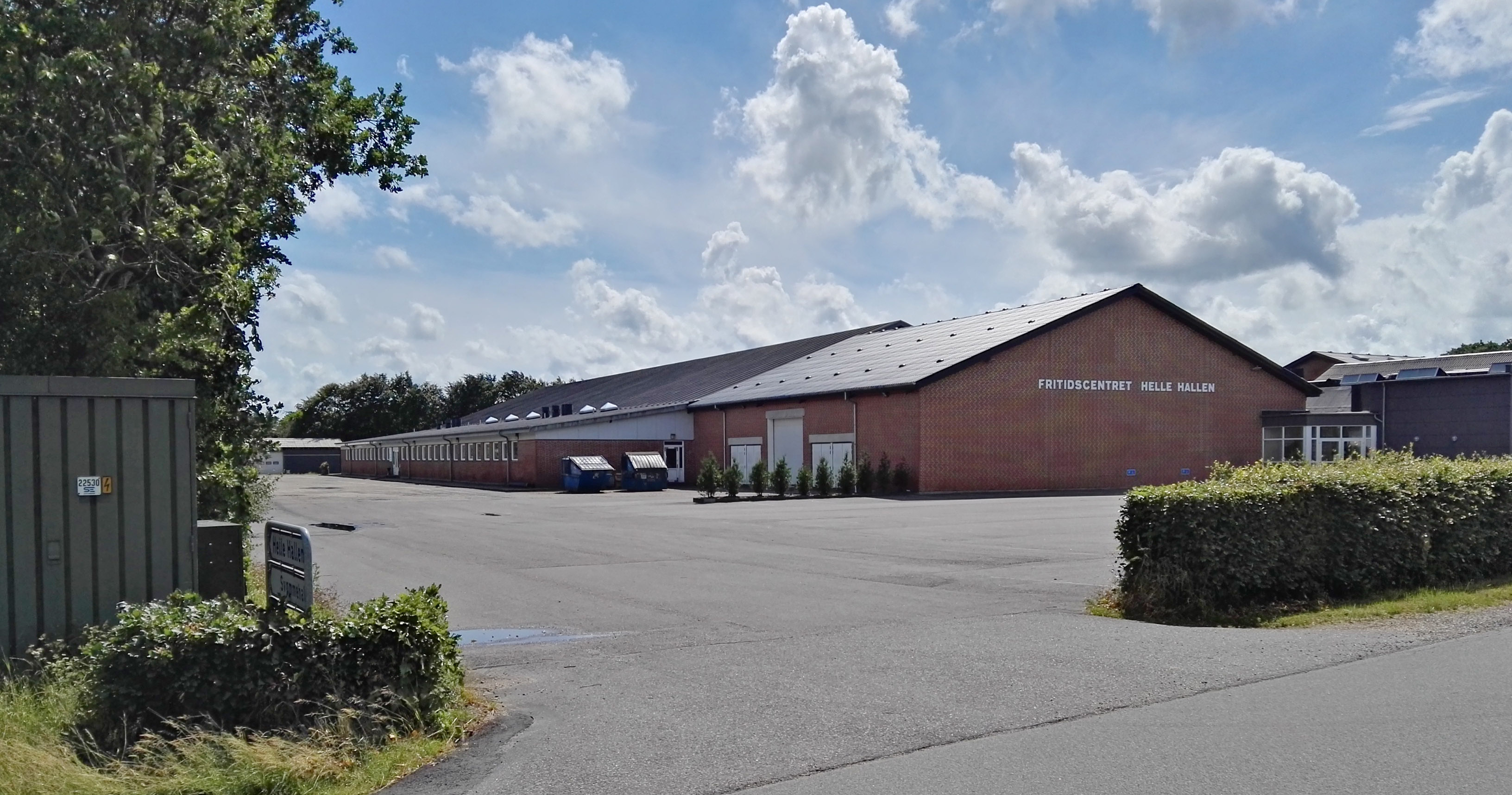

Until 1 January 2007 Helle municipality was a municipality (Danish, kommune) in Ribe County on the Jutland peninsula in southwest Denmark. It covered an area of 281 km^{2} and had a total population of 8,319 (2005). Its last mayor was Gylling Haahr, a member of the Venstre (Liberal Party) political party. The main town and site of its municipal council was the town of Årre.

Helle municipality ceased to exist due to Kommunalreformen ("The Municipality Reform" of 2007). It was merged with existing Blaabjerg, Blåvandshuk, Varde, and Ølgod municipalities to form a new Varde Municipality in Region of Southern Denmark.
