= Ølgod railway station =

Railway station in West Jutland, Denmark

Ølgod
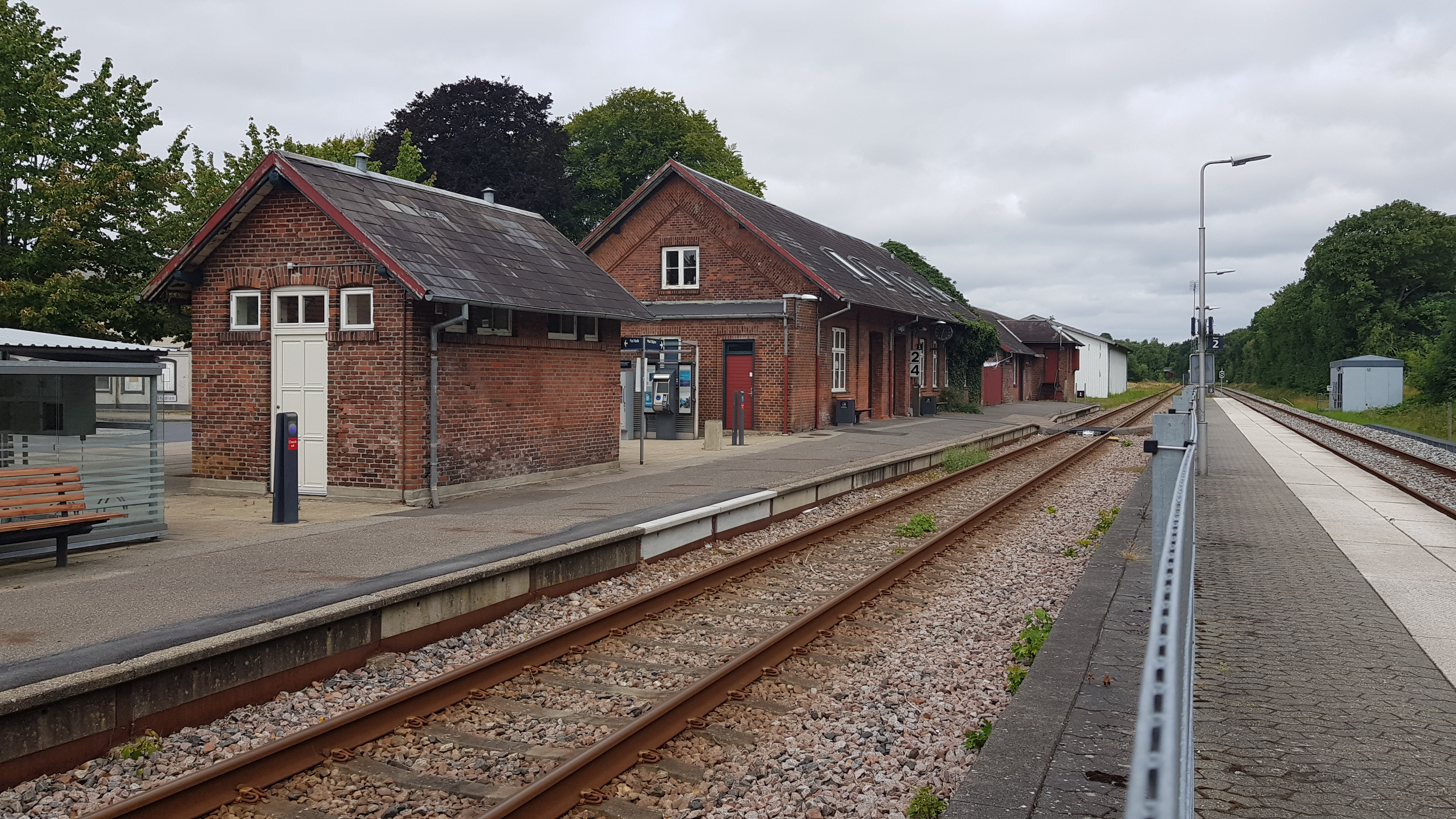
- Ølgod station in 2021

General information
- Location: Jernbanegade 14; 6870 Ølgod; Varde Municipality; Denmark
- Coordinates: 55°48′40″N 8°37′22″E
- Elevation: 43.6 metres (143 ft)
- Owner: Banedanmark
- Line: Esbjerg-Struer railway line (since 1875)
- Platforms: 2
- Tracks: 2
- Train operators: GoCollective

Construction
- Architect: Niels Peder Christian Holsøe

History
- Opened: 8 August 1875

Services
Preceding station	GoCollective	Following station
Gårde towards Esbjerg	Esbjerg–Skjern Regional train	Tarm towards Skjern
Location

Ølgod station is a railway station serving the railway town of Ølgod in West Jutland, Denmark.

Ølgod station is located on the Esbjerg–Struer railway line from Esbjerg to Struer. The station opened in 1875. It offers regional rail services to Aarhus, Esbjerg, Herning and Skjern, operated by the railway company GoCollective.

== History ==
The station opened on 8 August 1875 as the section from Varde to Ringkøbing of the new Esbjerg–Struer railway line opened.

== Architecture ==
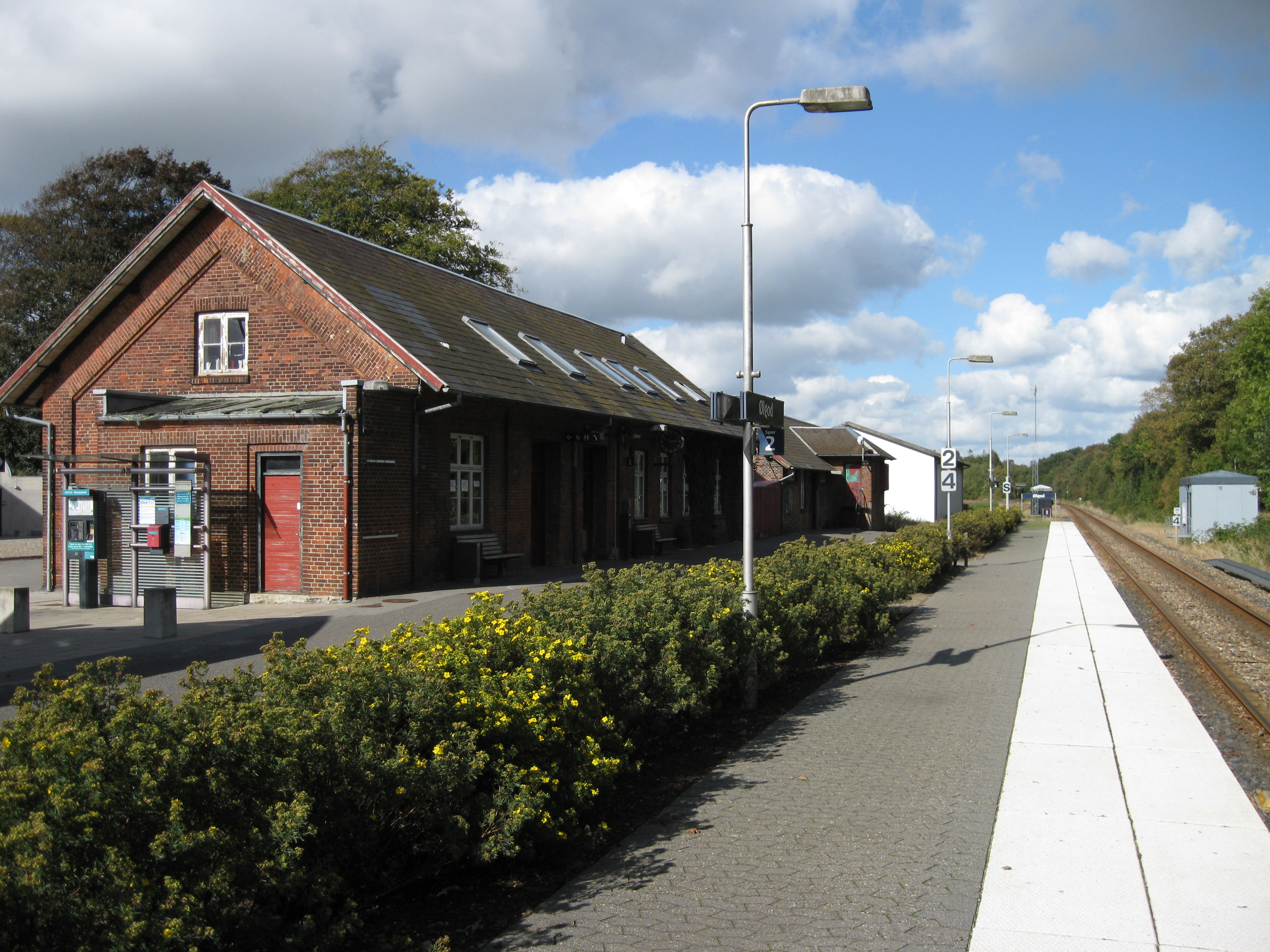
The station building in 2010.

Like the other stations on the Esbjerg–Struer railway line, the still existing station building from 1875 was built to designs by the Danish architect Niels Peder Christian Holsøe (1826–1895), known for the numerous railway stations he designed across Denmark in his capacity of head architect of the Danish State Railways.

== Services ==
The station offers direct regional rail services to Esbjerg, Skjern, Herning and Aarhus, operated by the private public transport operating company GoCollective.

== See also ==
- List of railway stations in Denmark
- Rail transport in Denmark
