= Tistrup railway station =

Railway station in West Jutland, Denmark

Tistrup
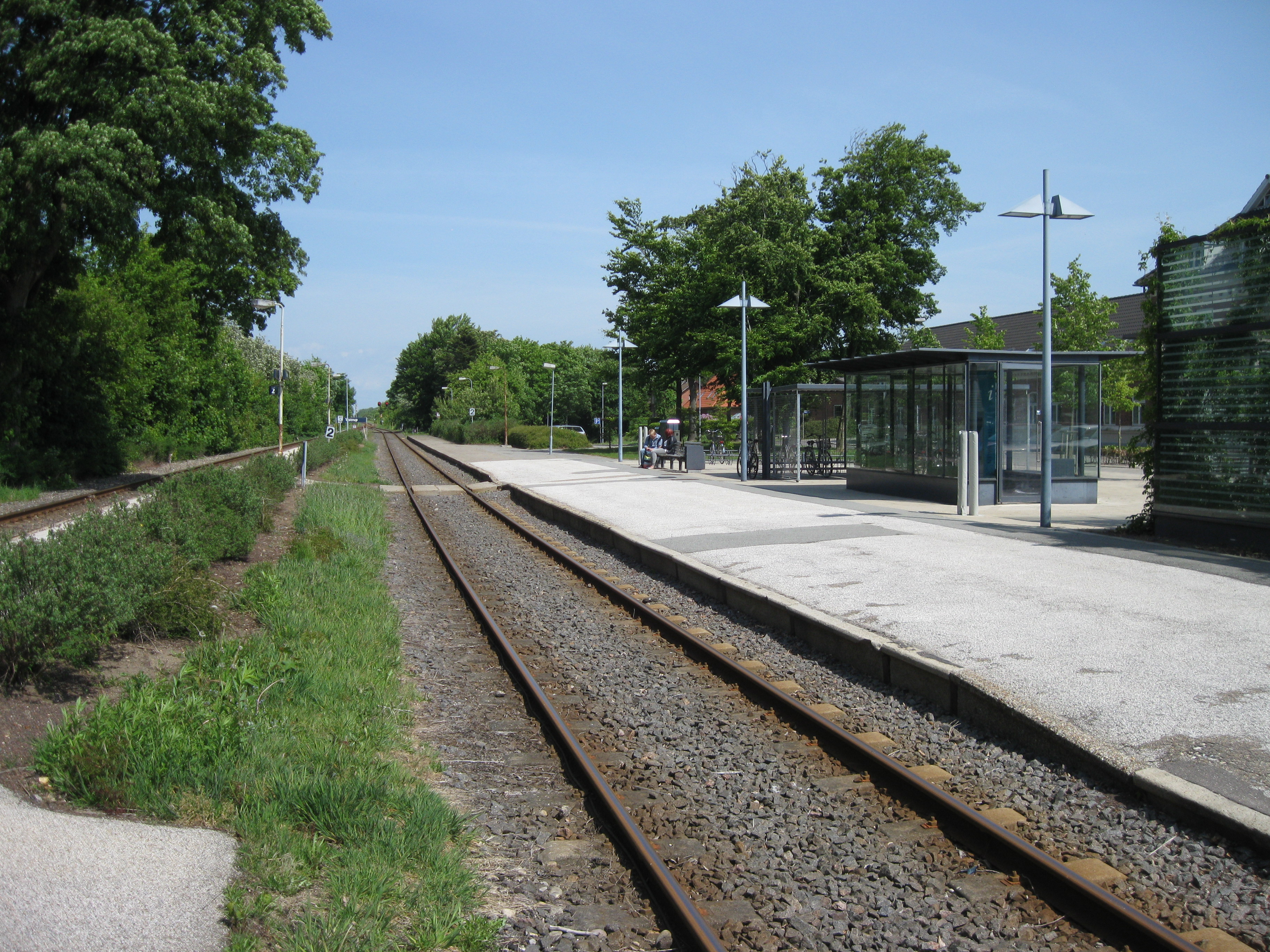
- Tistrup station in 2011

General information
- Location: Jernbanegade 2; 6862 Tistrup; Varde Municipality; Denmark
- Coordinates: 55°43′01″N 8°35′54″E
- Elevation: 29.6 metres (97 ft)
- Owner: Banedanmark
- Line: Esbjerg–Struer railway line
- Platforms: 2
- Tracks: 2
- Train operators: GoCollective

Construction
- Architect: Niels Peder Christian Holsøe

History
- Opened: 8 August 1875

Services
Preceding station	GoCollective	Following station
Sig towards Esbjerg	Esbjerg–Skjern Regional train	Gårde towards Skjern
Location

Tistrup station is a railway station serving the railway town of Tistrup in West Jutland, Denmark.

Tistrup station is located on the Esbjerg–Struer railway line from Esbjerg to Struer. The station opened in 1875. It offers regional rail services to Aarhus, Esbjerg, Herning and Skjern, operated by GoCollective.

== History ==
The station opened on 8 August 1875 as the section from Varde to Ringkøbing of the new Esbjerg–Struer railway line opened. The station has been unstaffed since 1970.

== Architecture ==
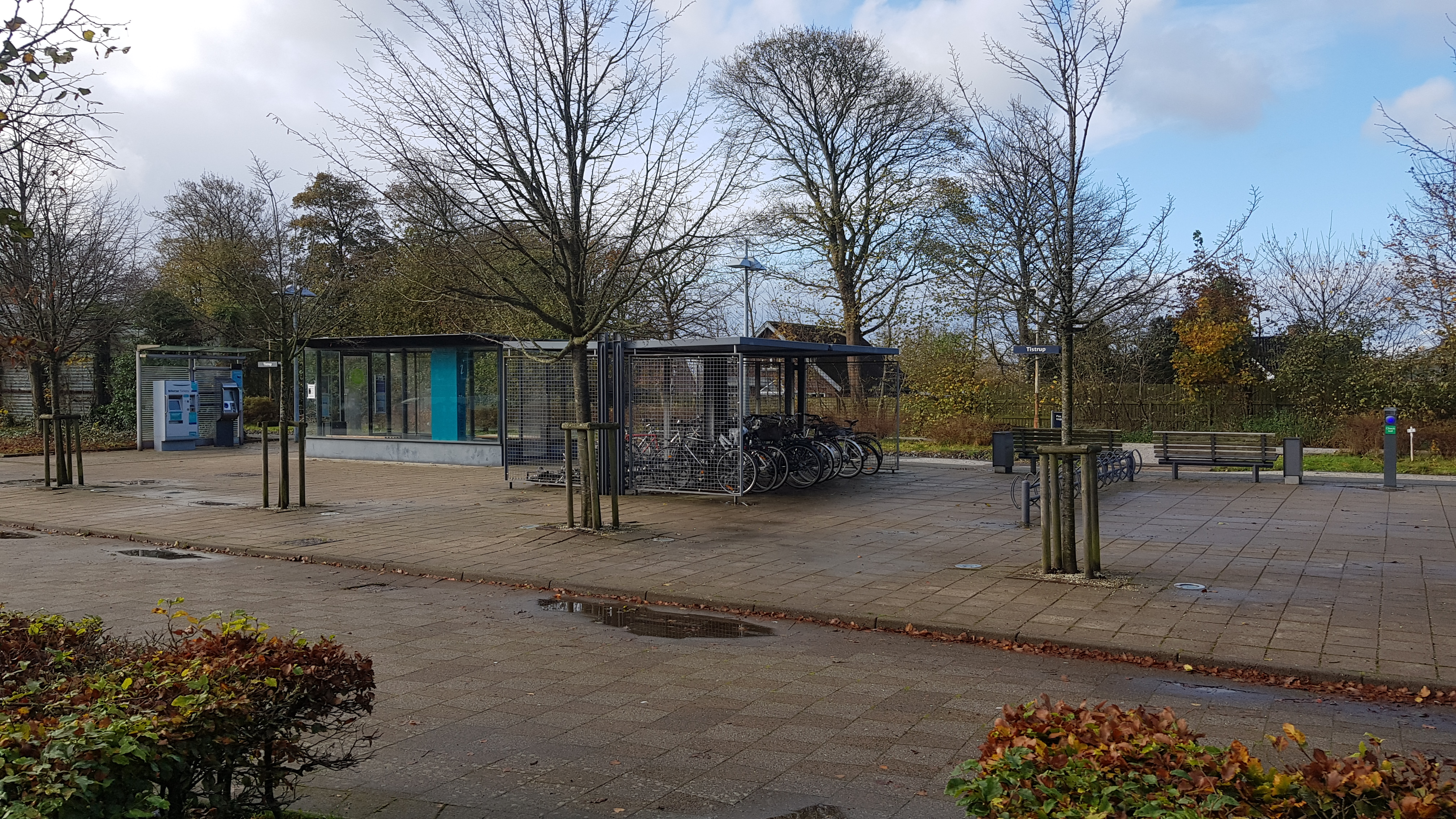
The station in October 2019.

Like the other stations on the Esbjerg–Struer railway line, the station building from 1875 was built to designs by the Danish architect Niels Peder Christian Holsøe (1826–1895), known for the numerous railway stations he designed across Denmark in his capacity of head architect of the Danish State Railways. The station building was torn down in September and October 2002.

== Services ==
The station offers direct regional rail services to Esbjerg, Skjern, Herning and Aarhus, operated by the private public transport operating company GoCollective.

== See also ==
- List of railway stations in Denmark
- Rail transport in Denmark
