= Lars Møller Madsen =

Danish handball player (born 1981)

Personal information
- Full name: Lars Lindholm Møller-Madsen
- Nationality: Danish
- Born: 30 May 1981 (age 45) Ølgod, Denmark
- Height: 2.05 m (6 ft 9 in)

Sport
- Sport: Handball
- Position: Left Back
- Current club: retired

Youth career
- Years: Team
- –: Ølgod IF
- –: IF Centrum
- –: Esbjerg

Senior clubs
- Years: Team
- 2001-2005: Skjern Håndbold
- 2005: BM Ciudad de Almería (loan)
- 2005-2009: Skjern Håndbold
- 2009-2010: Wisła Płock
- 2010-2014: IFK Kristianstad
- 2014-2018: HIF Karlskrona
National team
Years	Team	Apps	(Gls)
2003–2018	Denmark	74	(153)
Medal record
Representing Denmark
Men's handball
IHF World Men's Handball Championship
Bronze medal – third place	2007 Germany	Team competition
European Men's Handball Championship
Gold medal – first place	2008 Norway	Team competition
Bronze medal – third place	2006 Switzerland	Team competition

Lars Møller Madsen (born 30 May 1981 in Ølgod, Denmark) is a Danish team handball player. He has played for the Swedish clubs IFK Kristianstad and HIF Karlskrona, Polish Wisla Plock and Danish side Skjern Håndbold. He ended his career in 2008 at the age of 37. He is most famous for scoring the winning goal in quarter final against Iceland in the 2007 World Men's Handball Championship. The score was 41:41 at the time, where he scored Denmarks 42nd goal with 2 seconds remaining.

== Career ==
=== Skjern Håndbold ===
Early in his handball career he started educating himself as an electrician, but stopped when he became one of the key players at Skjern Håndbold. With Skjern he won the 2002 and 2003 EHF City Cup, the first two international titles for the club. He also reached the final of the Danish Cup in 2003 and 2004. In May 2005 he was loaned to BM Ciudad de Almería for one month.

After the 2007 World Championship he drew attention from various German top clubs, but still extended his contract at Skjern until 2010. He has the fifth most goals in Skjerns history.

=== Wisła Płock ===
In 2009 he left Skjern for Polish Wisła Płock, who activated his release clause and made him the biggest sale ever for Skjern. His time at the club was however plagued by injuries, and when he was available he was often not part of the match squads.

=== Sweden ===
In December 2010 he joined Swedish IFK Kristianstad after his contract at Wisła Płock was cancelled 6 months before the original expiry date. In 2014 he joined league rivals HIF Karlskrona. He retired in 2018.

== National team ==
He debuted for the Danish national team on his 22nd birthday against Iceland. His international breakthrough came at the 2006 European Championship, where he was the top scorer (9 goals) in the third place playoff match against Poland. He is European Champion by winning the 2008 European Championship with the Danish national handball team. At the 2007 World Championship he won bronze medals with the Danish team.
