= Sig railway station =

Railway station in West Jutland, Denmark

Sig
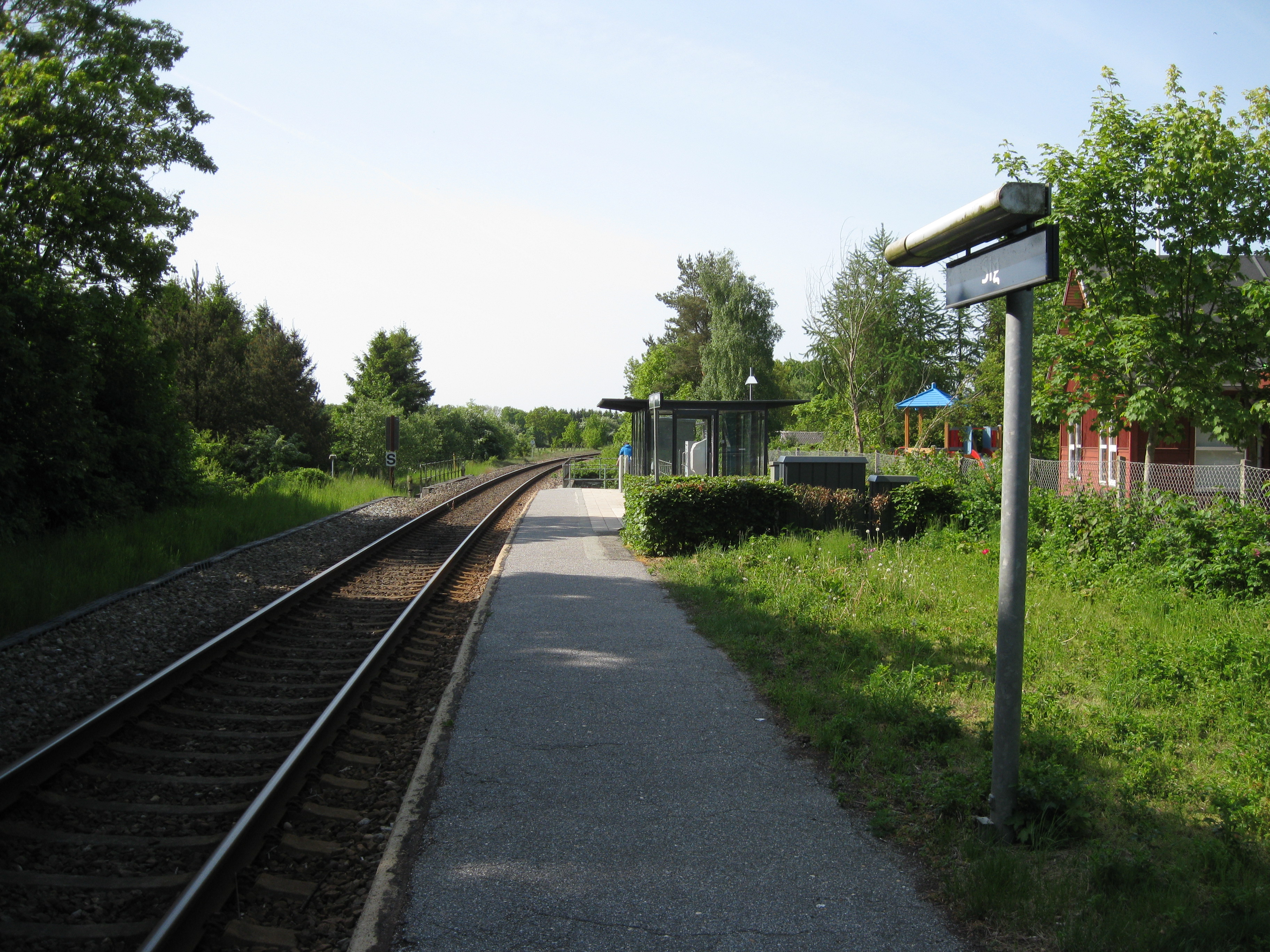
- Sig station in 2011

General information
- Location: Stationsvej 19; Sig, 6800 Varde; Varde Municipality; Denmark
- Coordinates: 55°39′57″N 8°34′38″E
- Elevation: 13.7 metres (45 ft)
- Owner: Banedanmark
- Line: Esbjerg-Struer railway line
- Platforms: 1
- Tracks: 1
- Train operators: GoCollective

History
- Opened: 1878

Services
| Preceding station | GoCollective | Following station |
|---|---|---|
| Varde North towards Esbjerg | Esbjerg–Skjern Regional train | Tistrup towards Skjern |
Location

Sig station is a railway station serving the village of Sig near Varde in West Jutland, Denmark.

Sig station is located on the Esbjerg–Struer railway line from Esbjerg to Struer. The station opened in 1878. It offers regional rail services to Aarhus, Esbjerg, Herning and Skjern, operated by the railway company GoCollective.

== History ==
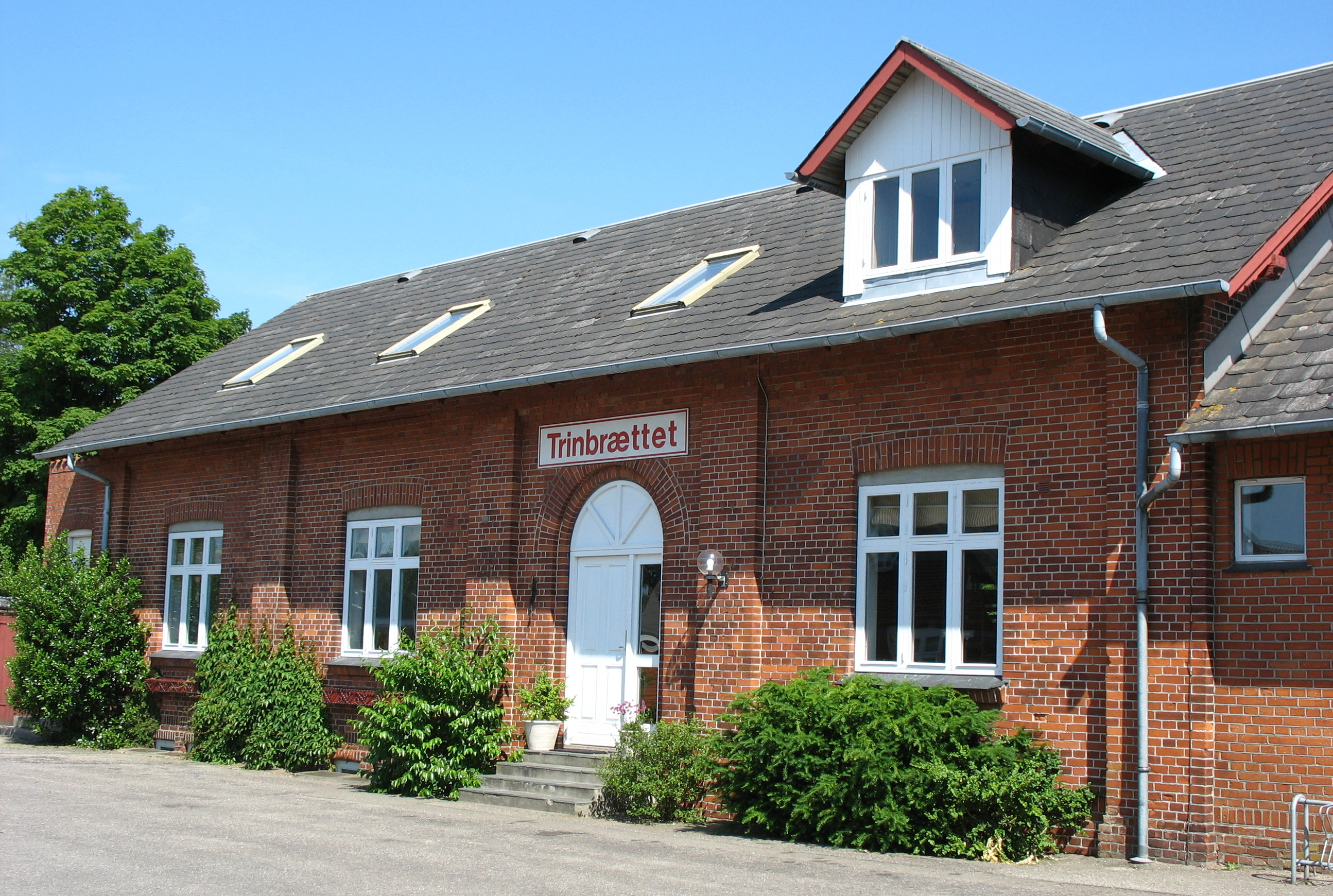
The station building of Sig station in 2007.

The station opened in 1878 as a railway halt with ticket sales on the Esbjerg–Struer railway line, which had opened three years before. It was later promoted to a station. It has been unstaffed since 1970.

== Services ==
The station offers direct regional rail services to Esbjerg, Skjern, Herning and Aarhus, operated by the railway company GoCollective.

== See also ==
- List of railway stations in Denmark
- Rail transport in Denmark
