= Ansager =

- Town
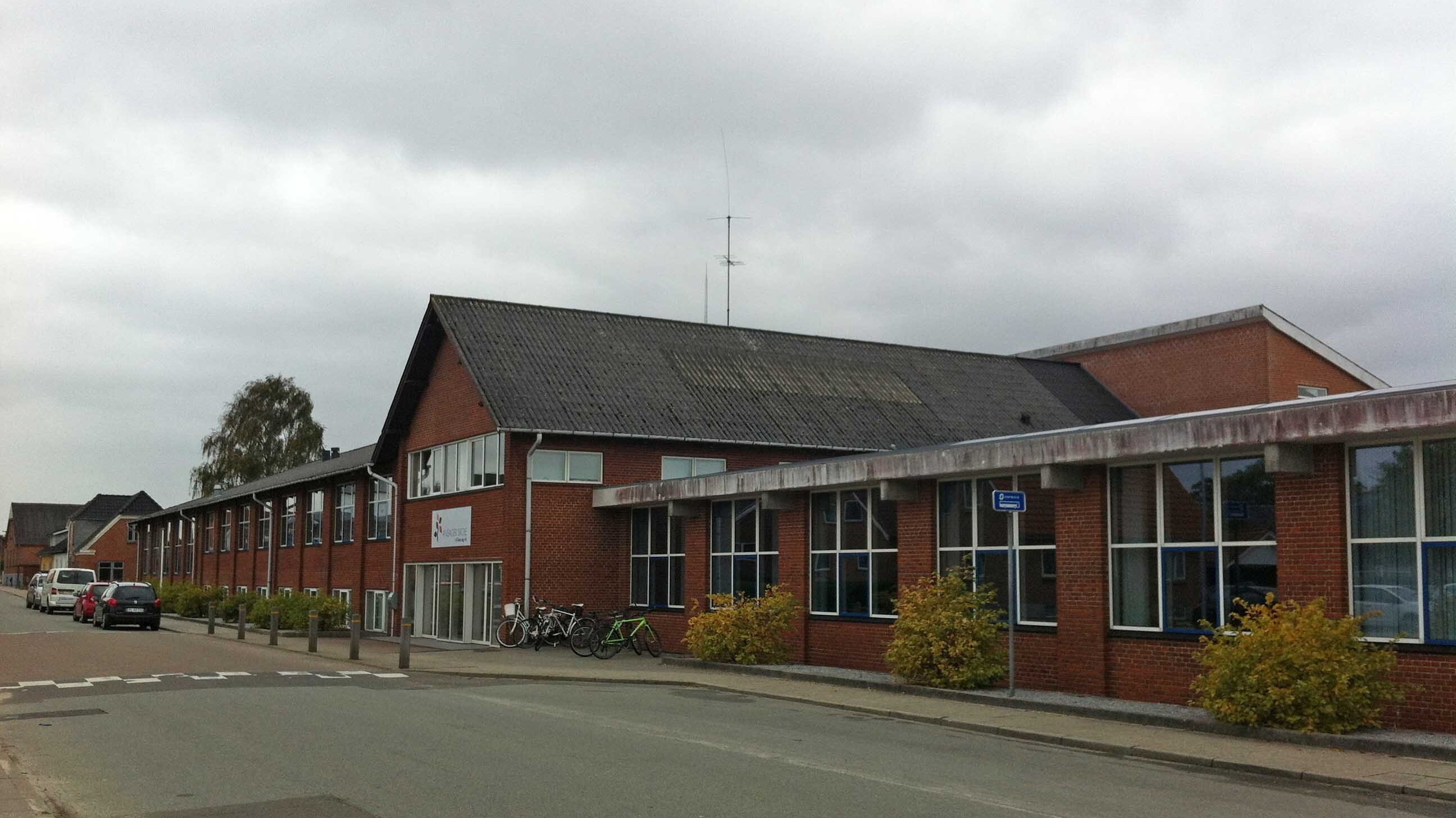
- School in Ansager

- Location within Region of Southern Denmark
- Coordinates: 55°42′16″N 8°45′15″E
- Country: Denmark
- Region: Southern Denmark (Syddanmark)
- Municipality: Varde

Area
  - Urban: 1.2 km^{2} (0.46 sq mi)

Population (2026)
  - Urban: 1,251
  - Urban density: 1,000/km^{2} (2,700/sq mi)

Ansager is a town in southwestern Jutland in the Varde Municipality, in Region of Southern Denmark. As of 1 January 2026, it has a population of 1,251.

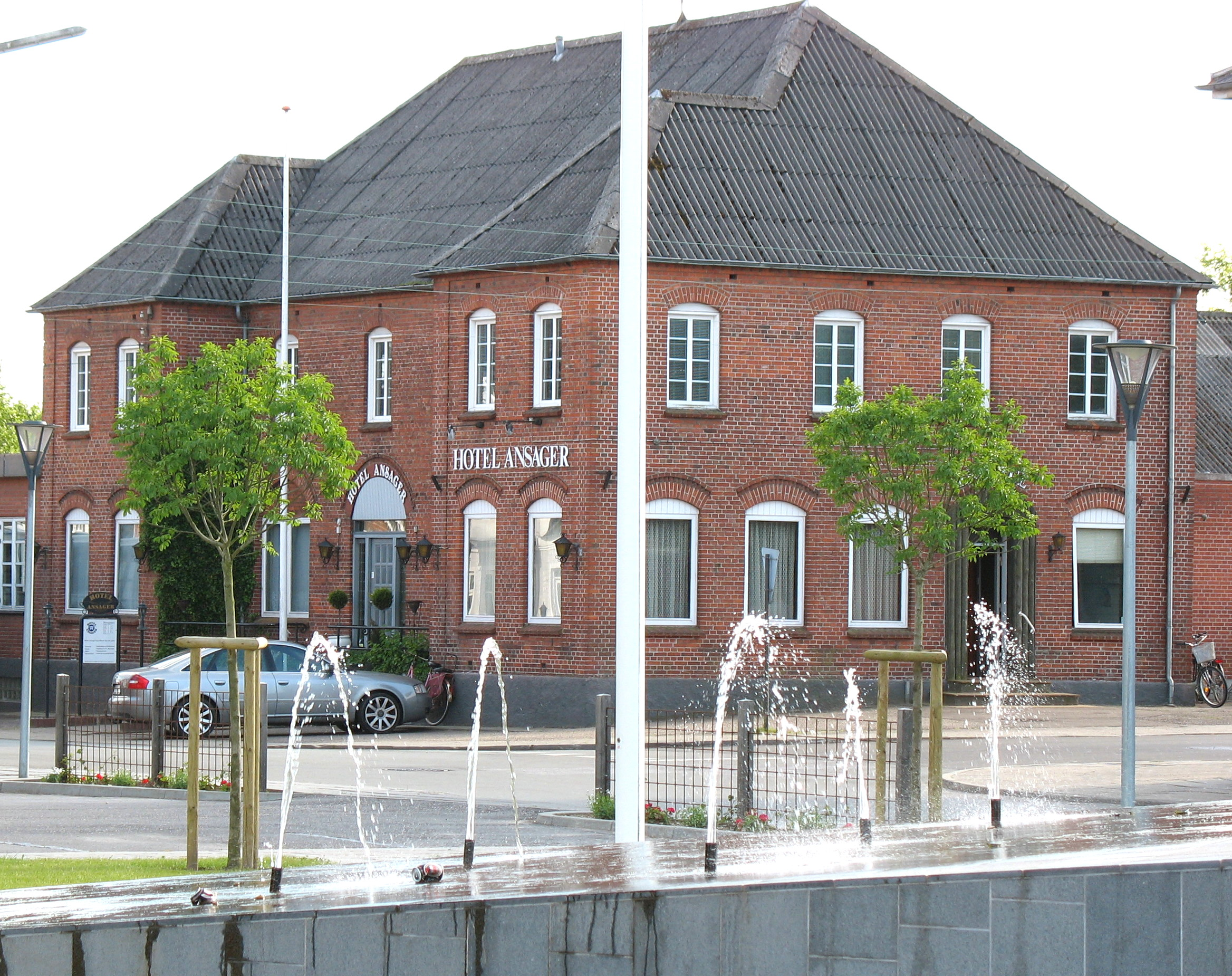
Hotel Ansager
