= Agerbæk =

- Town
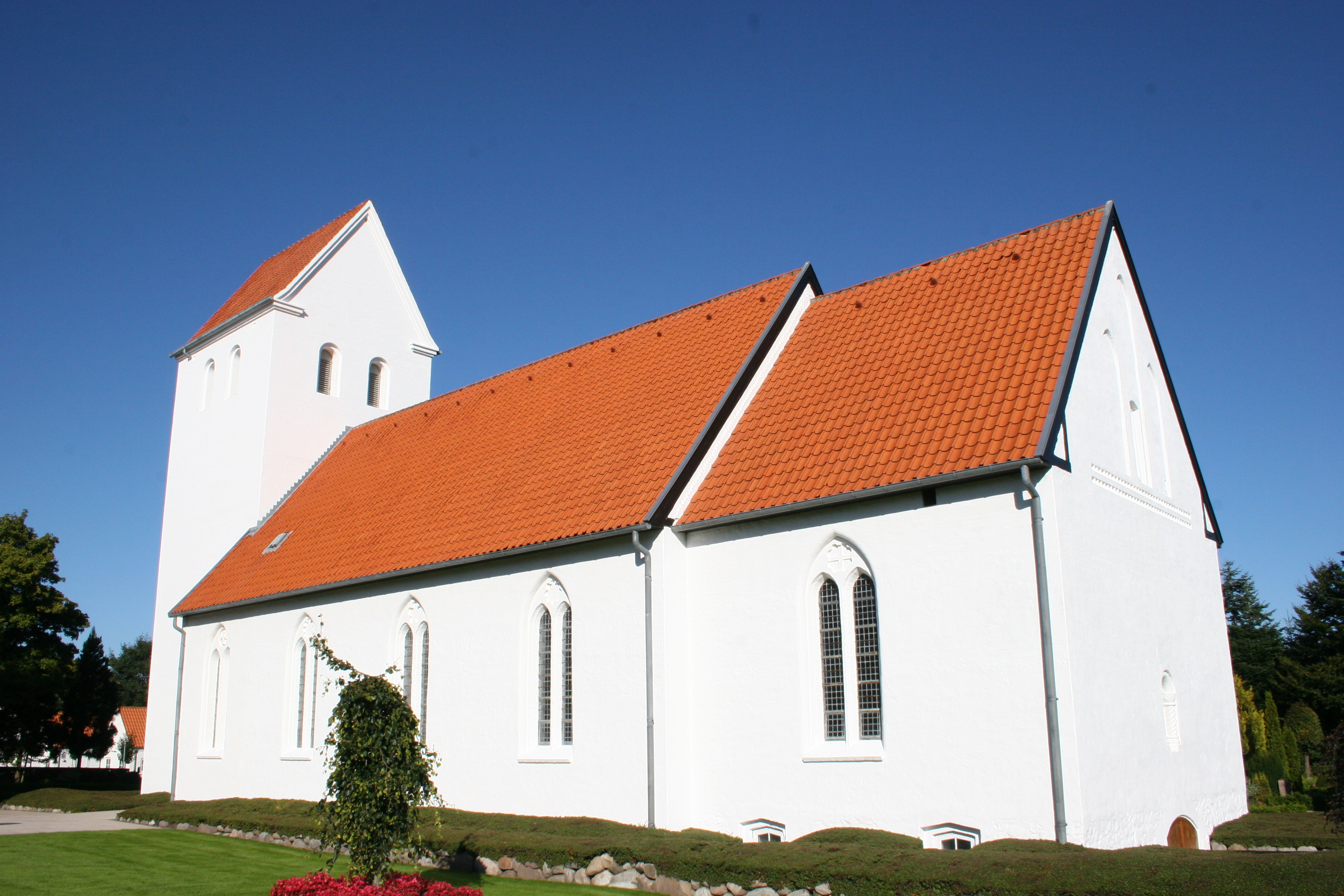
- Agerbæk Church, 2014

- Location within Region of Southern Denmark
- Coordinates: 55°35′53″N 8°48′19″E
- Country: Denmark
- Region: Southern Denmark (Syddanmark)
- Municipality: Varde

Area
  - Urban: 1.1 km^{2} (0.42 sq mi)

Population (2026)
  - Urban: 1,303
  - Urban density: 1,200/km^{2} (3,100/sq mi)

Agerbæk is a town in southwestern Jutland in the Varde Municipality, in Region of Southern Denmark. As of 1 January 2026, it has a population of 1,303.

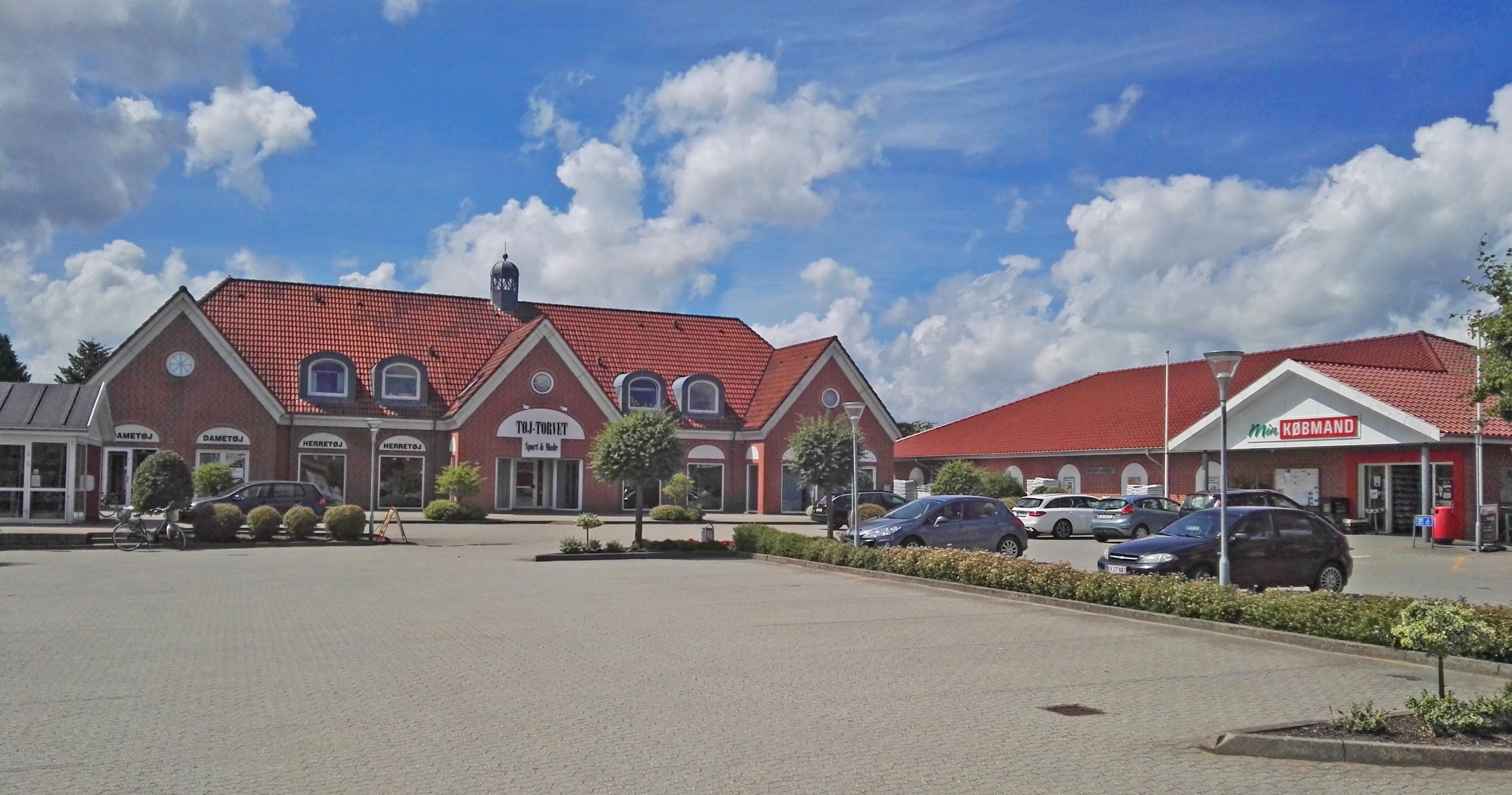
Shopping center and supermarket
