= Alslev =

- Town
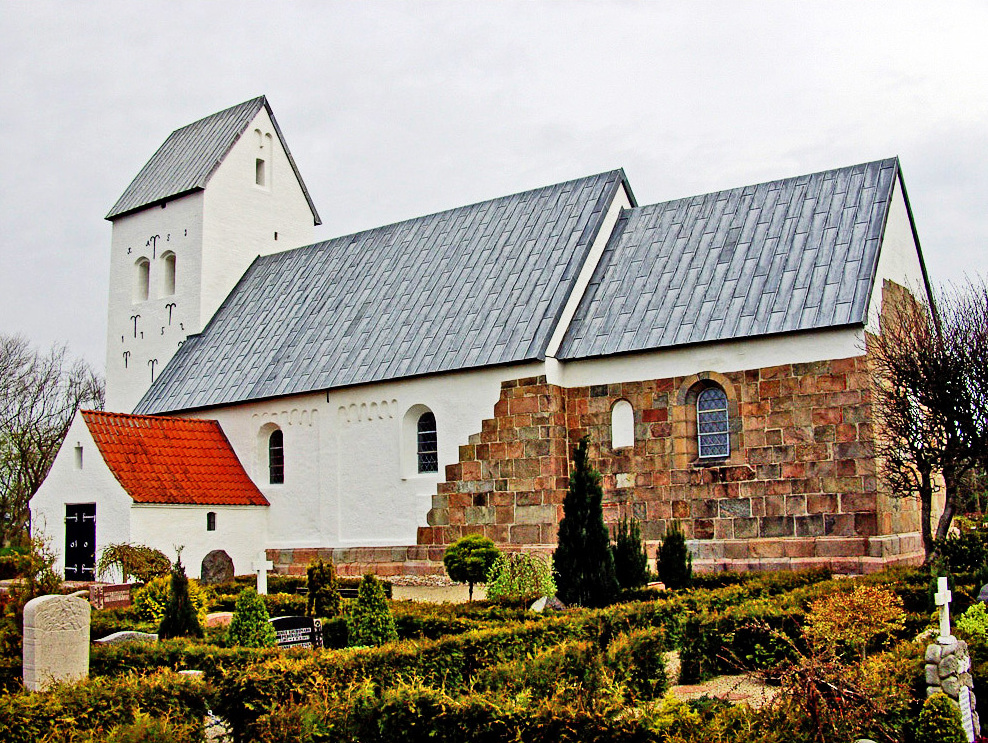
- Alslev Church

- Location within Region of Southern Denmark
- Coordinates: 55°35′19″N 8°25′5″E
- Country: Denmark
- Region: Southern Denmark (Syddanmark)
- Municipality: Varde

Area
  - Urban: 0.8 km^{2} (0.31 sq mi)

Population (2026)
  - Urban: 1,309
  - Urban density: 1,600/km^{2} (4,200/sq mi)

Alslev is a town in southwestern Jutland in the Varde Municipality, in Region of Southern Denmark. As of 1 January 2026, it has a population of 1,309.

Alslev and surrounding area was impacted by the F4 Tornado that hit multiple towns & villages north and north-west of Esbjerg on November 24, 1928. Minor damage was observed within Alslev.
