= Tistrup =

- Town
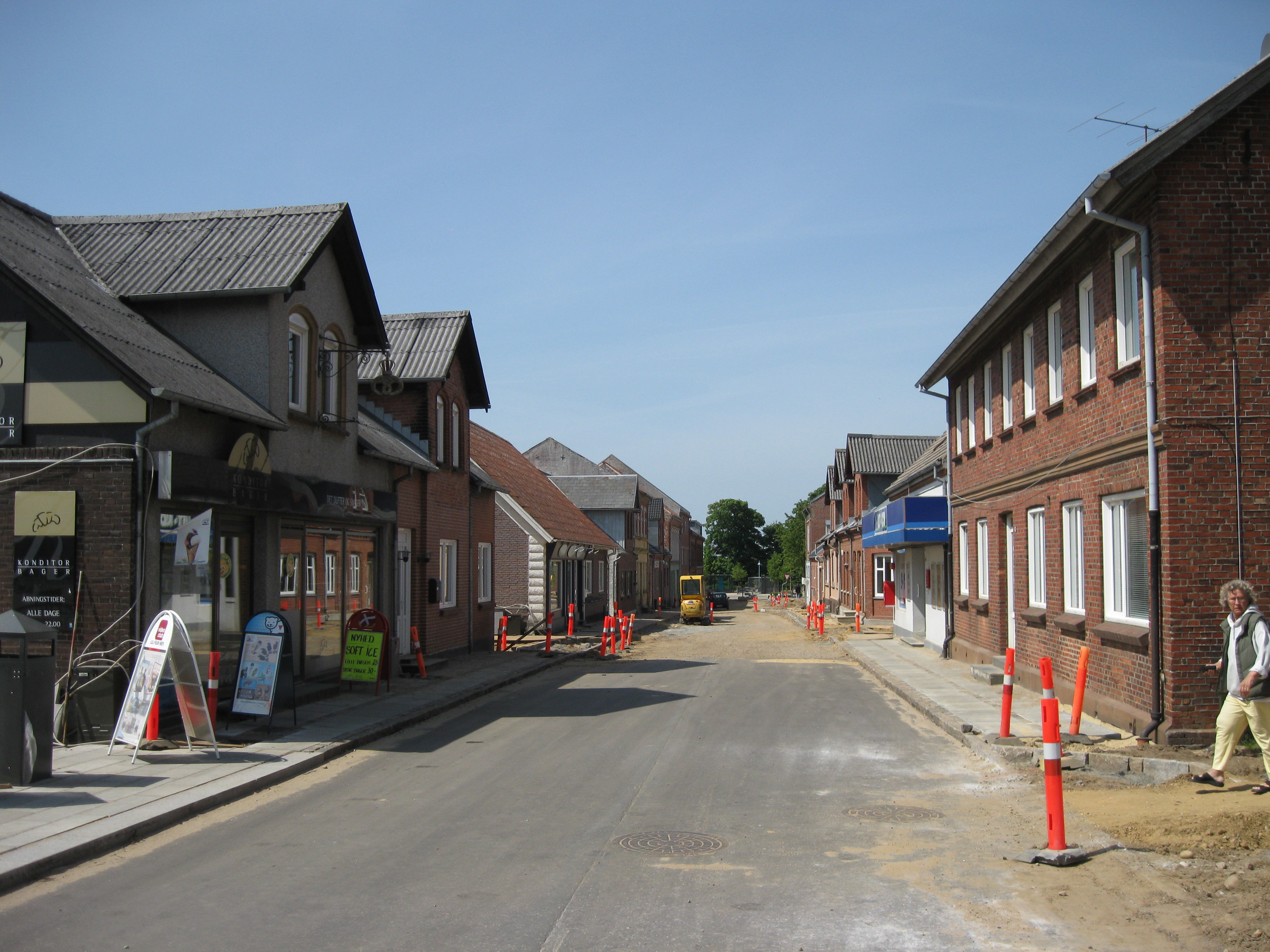

- Location within Region of Southern Denmark
- Coordinates: 55°43′0″N 8°35′53″E
- Country: Denmark
- Region: Southern Denmark (Syddanmark)
- Municipality: Varde

Area
  - Urban: 1.3 km^{2} (0.50 sq mi)

Population (2026)
  - Urban: 1,437
  - Urban density: 1,100/km^{2} (2,900/sq mi)

Tistrup is a town in southwestern Jutland in the Varde Municipality, in Region of Southern Denmark. As of 1 January 2026, it has a population of 1,437.

Tistrup is served by Tistrup railway station, located on the Esbjerg-Struer railway line.

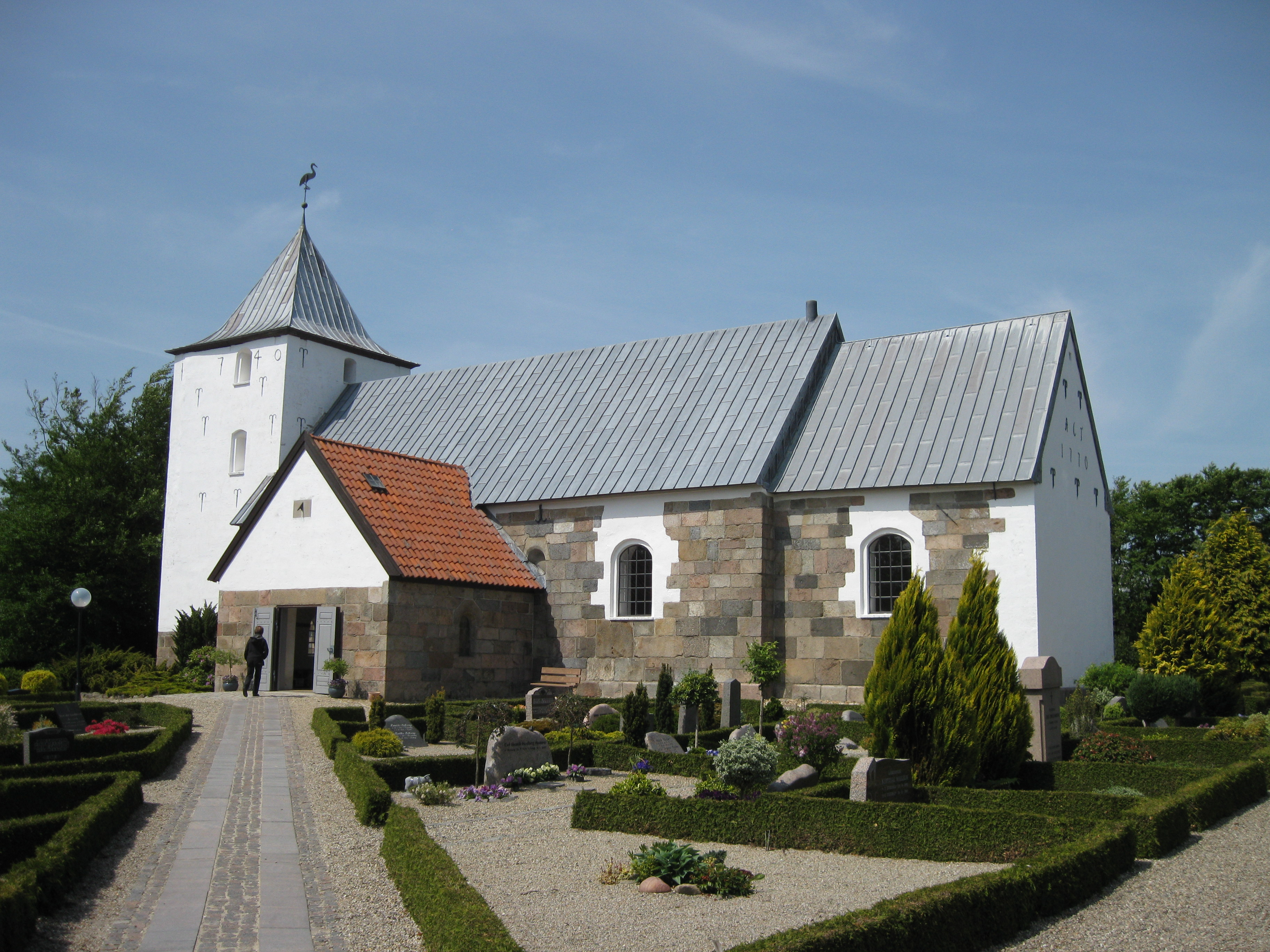
The Tistrup Church

Interest in archaeology in the late 19th century records excavations for buried relics near Tistrup, by Captain A. P. Madsen, of the Museum of Northern Antiquities
