= Årre =

- Town
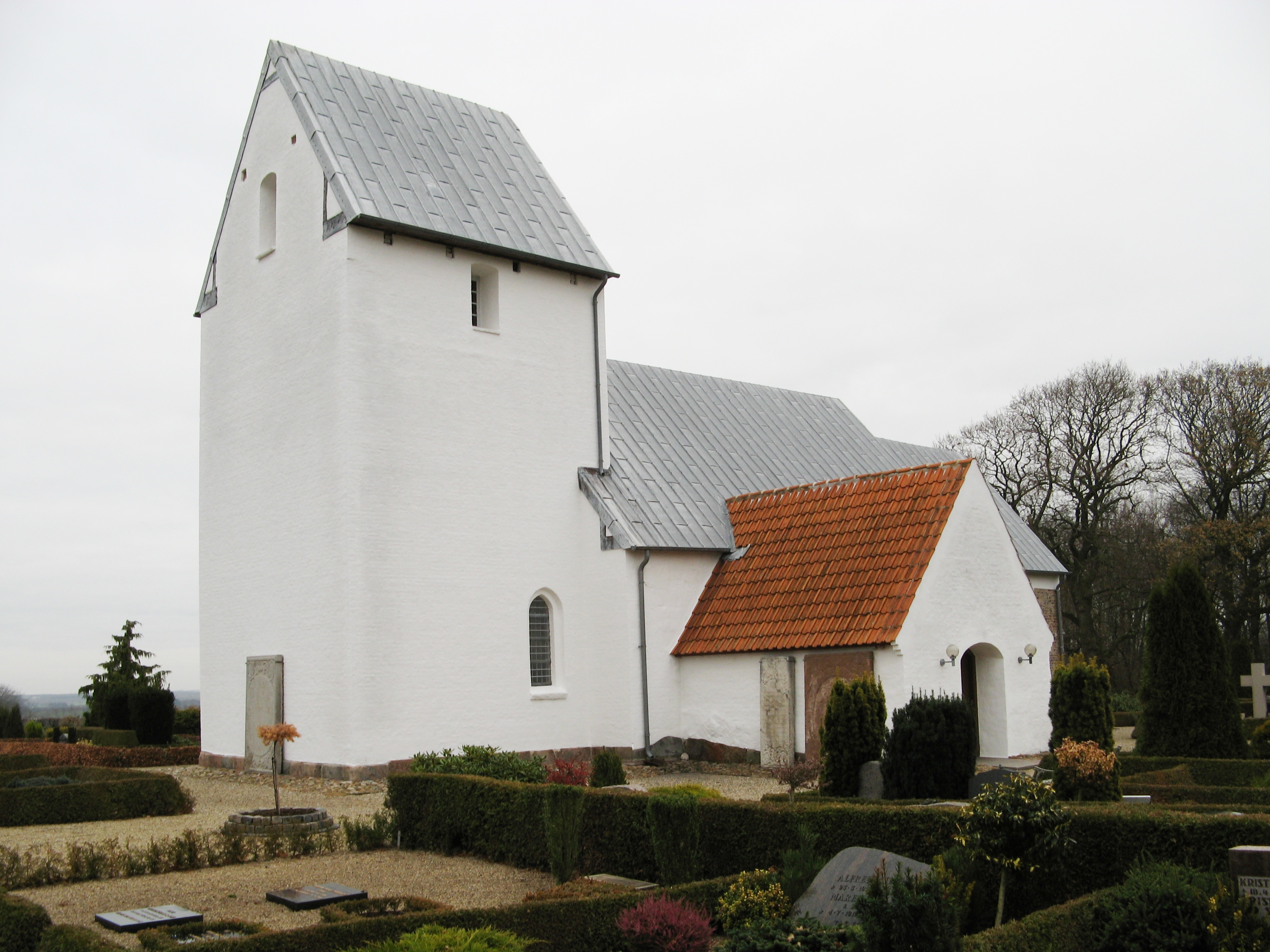
- Årre Church as seen from the southwest.

- Location in Region of Southern Denmark Årre (Denmark)
- Coordinates: 55°34′26″N 8°39′56″E
- Country: Denmark
- Region: Southern Denmark (Syddanmark)
- Municipality: Varde
- Parish: Årre

Population (2026)
  - Total: 652
- Time zone: UTC+1 (CET)
  - Summer (DST): UTC+2 (CEST)
- Postal Code: 6818

Årre is a small town in southwestern Jutland with a population of 652 (1. January 2026), located in Årre Parish. The town is located in Varde Municipality and belongs to the Region of Syddanmark. A little north of Årre town is Årre Kirke, a Romanesque church dating back to the 11th century with a late Gothic tower. In the town lies Årre Kro and Årre Skole. The school is a building with space for approx. 200 students and serves as an upper school for Årre, Fåborg and Hjortkær. Årre is located at main route 30 with 16 kilometers to Varde, 18 to Esbjerg and 29 to Grindsted.
