= Ølgod =

- Town
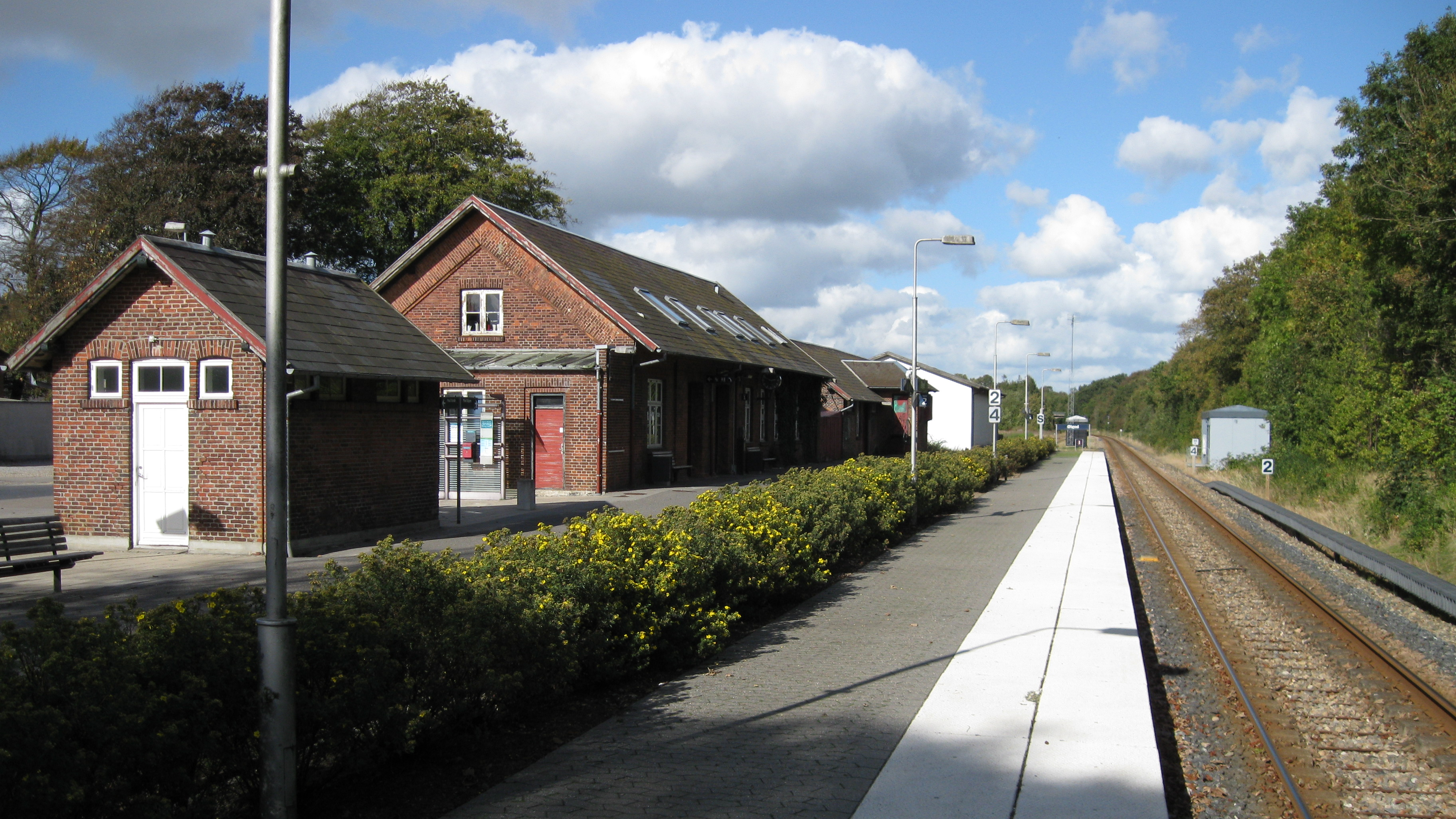
- Ølgod railway station

- Location in Denmark Ølgod (Region of Southern Denmark)
- Coordinates: 55°48′30″N 8°37′8″E
- Country: Denmark
- Region: Southern Denmark
- Municipality: Varde Municipality

Area
  - Urban: 2.94 km^{2} (1.14 sq mi)

Population (2026)
  - Urban: 3,714
  - Urban density: 1,260/km^{2} (3,270/sq mi)
- Time zone: UTC+1 (CET)
  - Summer (DST): UTC+2 (CEST)
- Postal code: DK-6870 Ølgod

Ølgod is a railway town on the Jutland peninsula in southwest Denmark. As of 1 January 2026, it had a population of 3,714.

Ølgod is served by Ølgod railway station, located on the Esbjerg-Struer railway line.

Despite the town's relatively small size, Ølgod calls itself "Denmark's smallest city" due to its relatively large number of shops, restaurants, associations, healthcare opportunities etc.

== Ølgod Church ==
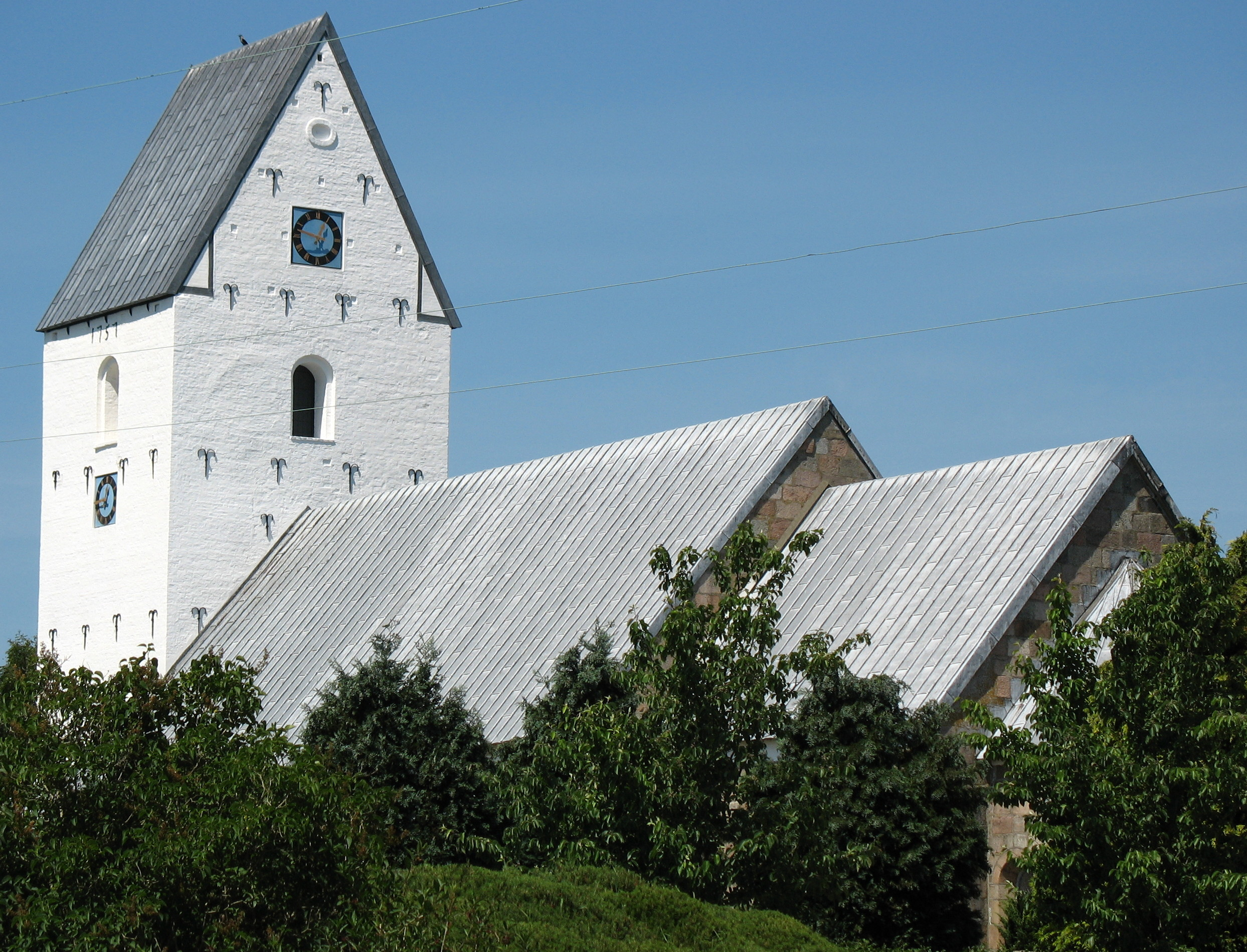
Ølgod Church

Ølgod Church is built in the Romanesque style, presumably as a manor church, around 1200. The church tower was built around 1500, while the altarpiece is from 1596.

== Museums ==
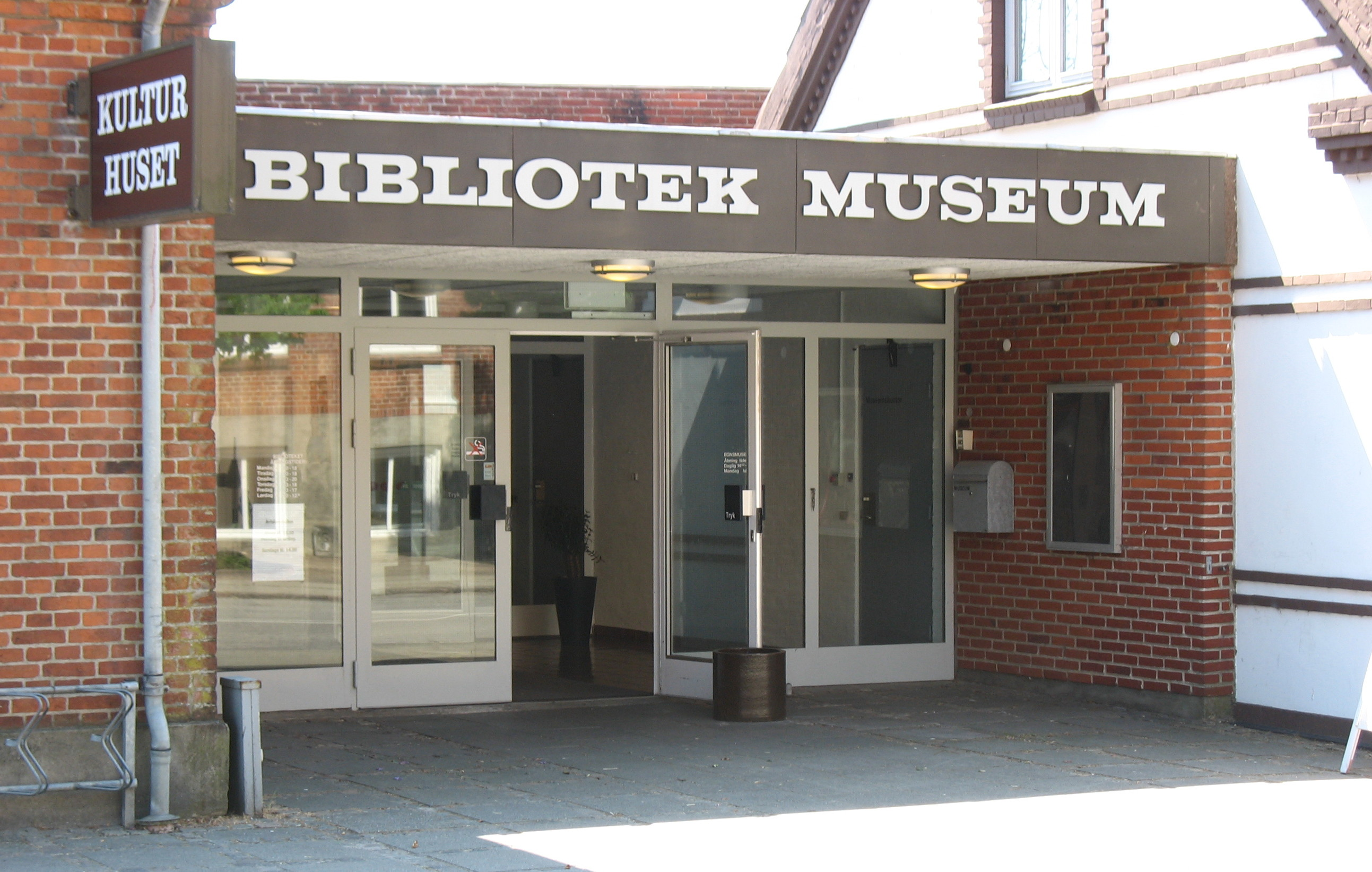
the entrance of Ølgod Museum and the Culture House

Ølgod Museum, located in the Culture House, tells the story of Danish agriculture, from poor heath farmers to democratic modern farmers.

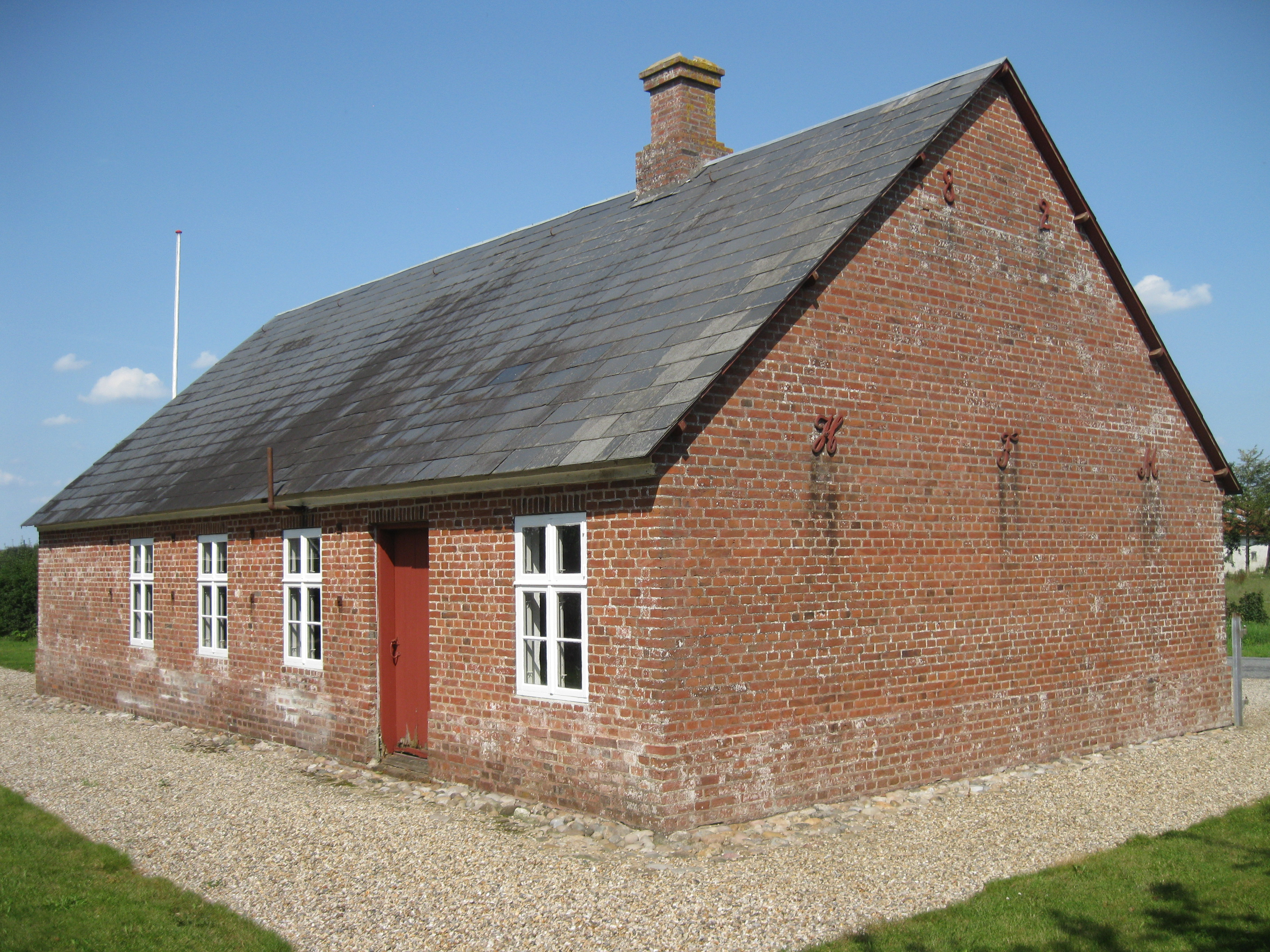
Hjedding Andelsmejeri - the dairy museum

Hjedding Andelsmejeri, situated about 2 kilometres (1.2 mi) south of Ølgod, was the first cooperative dairy in Denmark, founded in 1882. Now it is a museum where the machines that helped to revolutionise the Danish dairy operation are on display.

== Ølgod Municipality ==
The former Ølgod Municipality covered an area of 247 square kilometres (95 sq mi) and had a total population of 11,351 as of 2005. Ølgod Municipality's last mayor was Erik Buhl Nielsen.

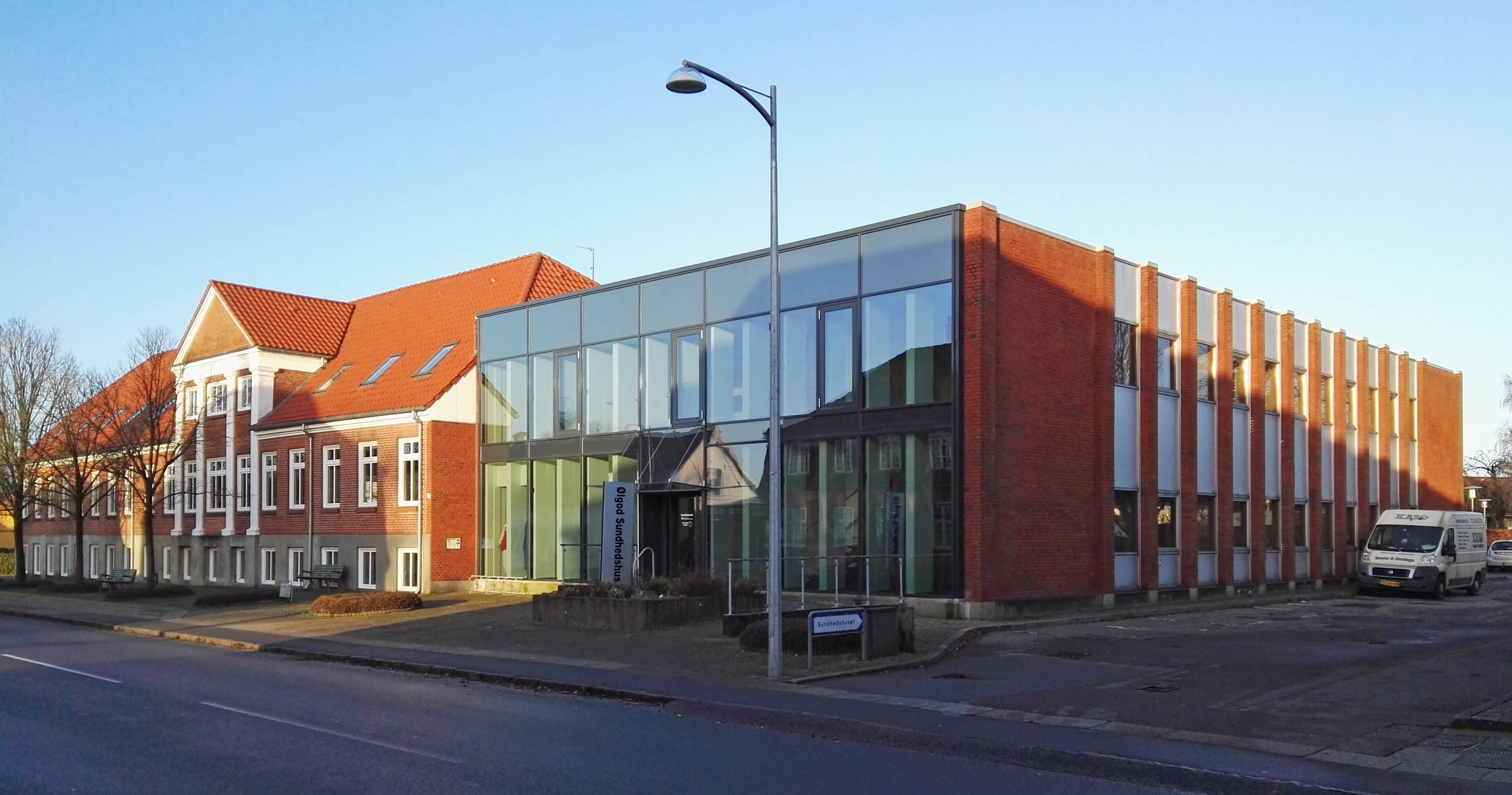
The former townhall of Ølgod Municipality

On 1 January 2007, the municipality ceased to exist as a result of the Kommunalreformen. It was merged with Blaabjerg, Blåvandshuk, Helle and Varde municipalities to form a new Varde Municipality.

== References in popular culture ==
Ølgod native Maren Madsen Christensen wrote a memoir titled Fra Jyllands Brune Heder til Landet Over Havet (Eng: From Jutland's Brown Heather to the Land Across the Sea) about her time growing up in Denmark and her later life in Yarmouth, Maine. Christensen died in 1965, aged 93.

== Notable people ==
- Mette Magrete Tvistman (1741–1827), the first female clockmaker in Denmark. She had her own workshop in Ølgod from 1787 to 1798
- Jacob Stilling-Andersen (1858–1933), a dairy manager and businessman
- Margrethe Vestager (born 1968), a politician, former minister and European Commissioner
- Lars Møller Madsen (born 1981), a retired handball player who won the European Men's Handball Championship in 2008 with Denmark
