= Varde Municipality =

Varde Municipality Varde Kommune (Danish)
- Municipality
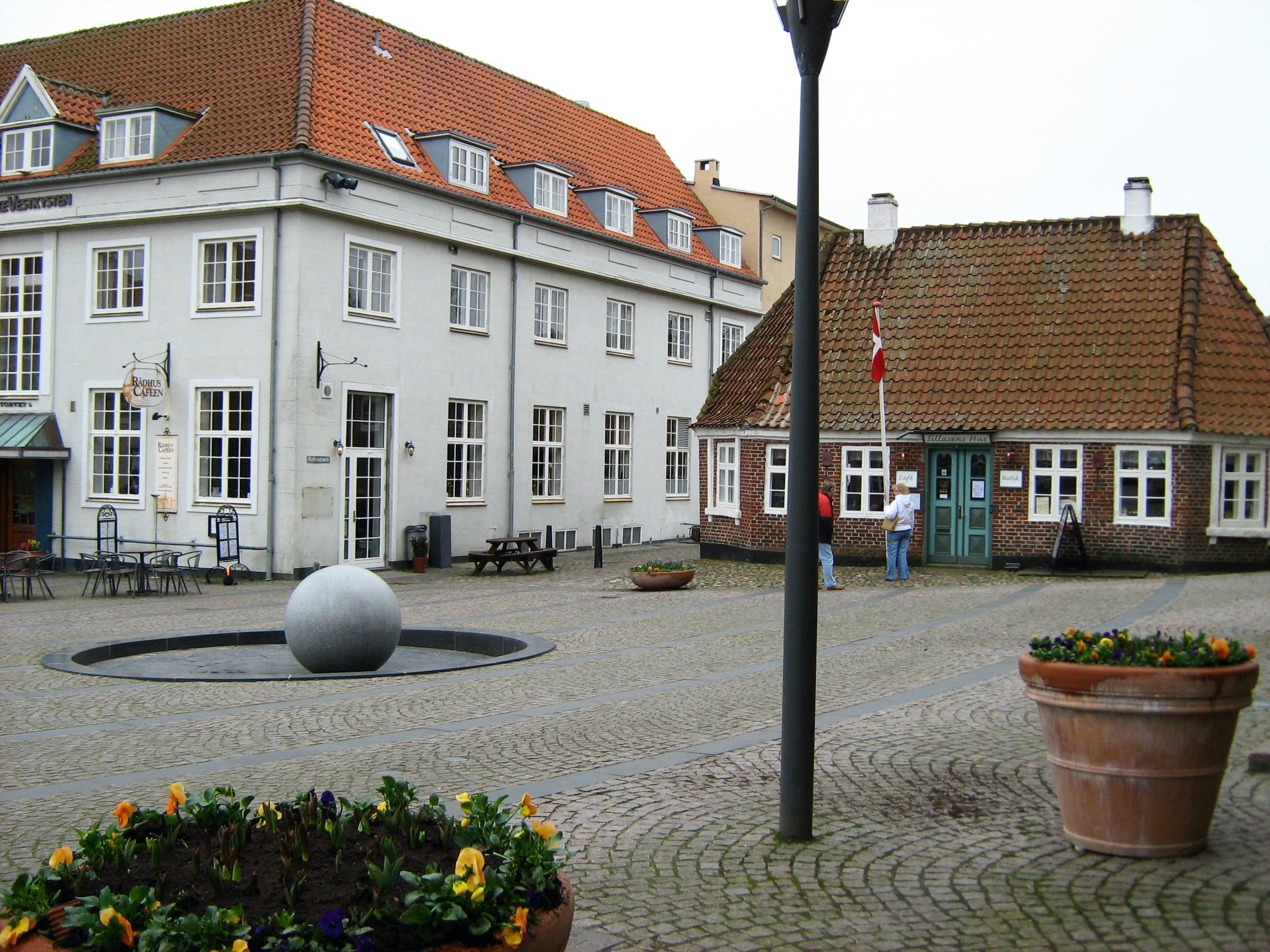

- Coat of arms

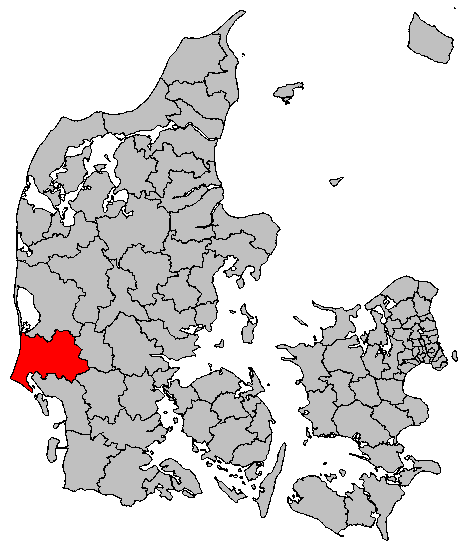
- Location in Denmark
- Coordinates: 55°38′00″N 8°29′00″E
- Country: Denmark
- Region: Southern Denmark
- Established: 1 January 2007

Government
  - Mayor: Sarah Andersen

Area
  - Total: 1,256 km^{2} (485 sq mi)

Population (1 January 2026)
  - Total: 49,468
  - Density: 39.39/km^{2} (102.0/sq mi)
- Time zone: UTC+1 (CET)
  - Summer (DST): UTC+2 (CEST)
- Postal code: 6800
- Website: vardekommune.dk

Varde Municipality (Danish: Varde Kommune) is a kommune in the Region of Southern Denmark on the west coast of the Jutland peninsula in southwest Denmark. Its mayor is Mads Sørensen, a member of the Venstre (Liberal Party) political party. The main town and site of its municipal council is the town of Varde. It covers an area of 1255.79 km^{2} with a population of 49,468 (2026).

On 1 January 2007 Varde municipality was, as a result of Kommunalreformen ("The Municipal Reform" of 2007), merged with the existing Blaabjerg, Blåvandshuk, most of Helle (Grimstrup parish, a part of the former Helle Municipality, merged with Esbjerg Municipality), and Ølgod municipalities to form a new Varde municipality. Årre is also located in Varde.

== Locations ==
Varde	14,000
Ølgod	3,800
Oksbøl	2,800
Tistrup	1,400
Nørre Nebel	1,350
Agerbæk	1,300
Alslev	1,300
Ansager	1,300

== Politics ==
Varde's municipal council consists of 25 members, elected every four years. The municipal council has six political committees.

=== Municipal council ===
Below are the municipal councils elected since the Municipal Reform of 2007.

Election	Party												Total seats	Turnout	Elected mayor
Election	A	B	C	D	F	I	K	L	L	O	V	Ø	Total seats	Turnout	Elected mayor
2005	4		3					8			16		31	73.5%	Gylling Haahr (V)
2009	5		2		2			2		1	13		25	66.2%	Gylling Haahr (V)
2013	4	1	2							2	15	1	25	73.4%	Erik Buhl Nielsen (V)
2017	6	1	1			1			2	2	12		25	72.4%	Erik Buhl Nielsen (V)
2021	6		5	1	1		1				10		25	68.4%	Mads Sørensen (V)
Data from Kmdvalg.dk 2005, 2009, 2013, 2017 and 2021
