= Nørholm =

Nørholm may refer to:

- Nørholm, Varde Municipality, a manor house in Varde Municipality, Denmark
- Nørholm (Norway), a manor house in Norway
- SS Norholm, the WWII tanker
