= Listed buildings in Varde Municipality =

This is a list of listed buildings in Varde Municipality, Denmark.

== The list ==
=== 33, 6800 Varde ===
Listing name	Image	Location	Coordinates	Description
Gellerupholm		Gellerupvej 61, 6800 Varde		]
Kampmann House		Storegade 33, 6800 Varde		
Kampmann House		Storegade 33, 6800 Varde		
Lunderup		Lundvej 176, 6800 Varde		
Lundvej 39		Lundvej 39, 6800 Varde		
Lundvej 39		Lundvej 39, 6800 Varde		
Nørholm		Stokkebrovej 1, 6800 Varde		
Nørholm		Stokkebrovej 1, 6800 Varde		
Nørholm		Stokkebrovej 1, 6800 Varde		
Silasens Hus		Torvet 5, 6800 Varde		
Varde Customs House		Storegade 1, 6800 Varde		
Varde Station		Stationspladsen 3, 6800 Varde		
Villa Krogen		Frisvadvej 44, 6800 Varde		

=== 6830 Nørre Nebel ===
Listing name	Image	Location	Coordinates	Description
Nymindegab Redningsstation		Redningsvejen 71, 6830 Nørre Nebel		

=== 6840 Oksbøl ===
Listing name	Image	Location	Coordinates	Description
Hesselmed		Hesselmedvej 8, 6840 Oksbøl		
Karlsgårde Vandkraftværk		Karlsgårdevej 64, 6800 Varde		
Kærgård Båke		Kærgårdvej 0, 6840 Oksbøl		

=== 6851 Janderup Vest ===
Listing name	Image	Location	Coordinates	Description
Store Hebo		St Hebovej 17, 6851 Janderup Vestj		

=== 6853 Vejers Strand ===
Listing name	Image	Location	Coordinates	Description
Ringebjerge Båke		Vejers Sydstrand 0, 6853 Vejers Strand		

=== 6854 Henne ===
Listing name	Image	Location	Coordinates	Description
Hennegård		Strandvejen 260, 6854 Henne		
Hennegård		Strandvejen 260, 6854 Henne		
Hennegård		Strandvejen 260, 6854 Henne		

=== 6857 Blåvand ===
Listing name	Image	Location	Coordinates	Description
Blåvandshuk Fyr		Fyrvej 106, 6857 Blåvand		
Hovej 21		Hovej 21, 6857 Blåvand		
Hovej 21		Hovej 21, 6857 Blåvand		
Hovej 21		Hovej 21, 6857 Blåvand		
Ho Præstegård		Hovej 32, 6857 Blåvand		
Per Knoldsvej 58		Per Knoldsvej 58, 6857 Blåvand		
Reginevej 1		Reginevej 1, 6857 Blåvand		
Strandgården		Skippervej 1A, 6857 Blåvand		
Tanne Hedevej 7		Tane Hedevej 7, 6857 Blåvand		

=== 6862 Tistrup ===
Listing name	Image	Location	Coordinates	Description
Hodde School		Letbækvej 15, 6862 Tistrup		

=== 6870 Ølgod ===
Listing name	Image	Location	Coordinates	Description
Gjødsvang, Peder Holden Hansens eget hus		Johnsgårdvej 13, 6870 Ølgod		
