= Villa Krogen =

Danish historic house

General information
- Location: Varde, Denmark
- Coordinates: 55°37′35.87″N 8°29′12.3″E
- Completed: 1899

Design and construction
- Architect: Martin Nyrop

Villa Krogen is a Martin Nyrop-designed, National Romantic house in Varde, Denmark. It was listed on the Danish register of protected buildings and places in 2002.

== History ==
Nicolaus Brix served as headmaster of Varde Mellem- og Realskole from August 1884. His wife Anna Marie Ohrt (1838–93) died in 1893. In1895, he married secondly to Caroline Mathilde Laub (1855–1942) His new wife's sister Louise Frederikke Laub (1851–1933) was married to the architect Martin Nyrop. The couple charged Nyrop with the design of a new home for them on a plot of land on Frisvadvej in Varde. The house was completed in 1899. It was listed on the Danish register of protected buildings and places in 2002.
