= Iver Vind =

Danish statesman, diplomat and landowner (1590–1658)

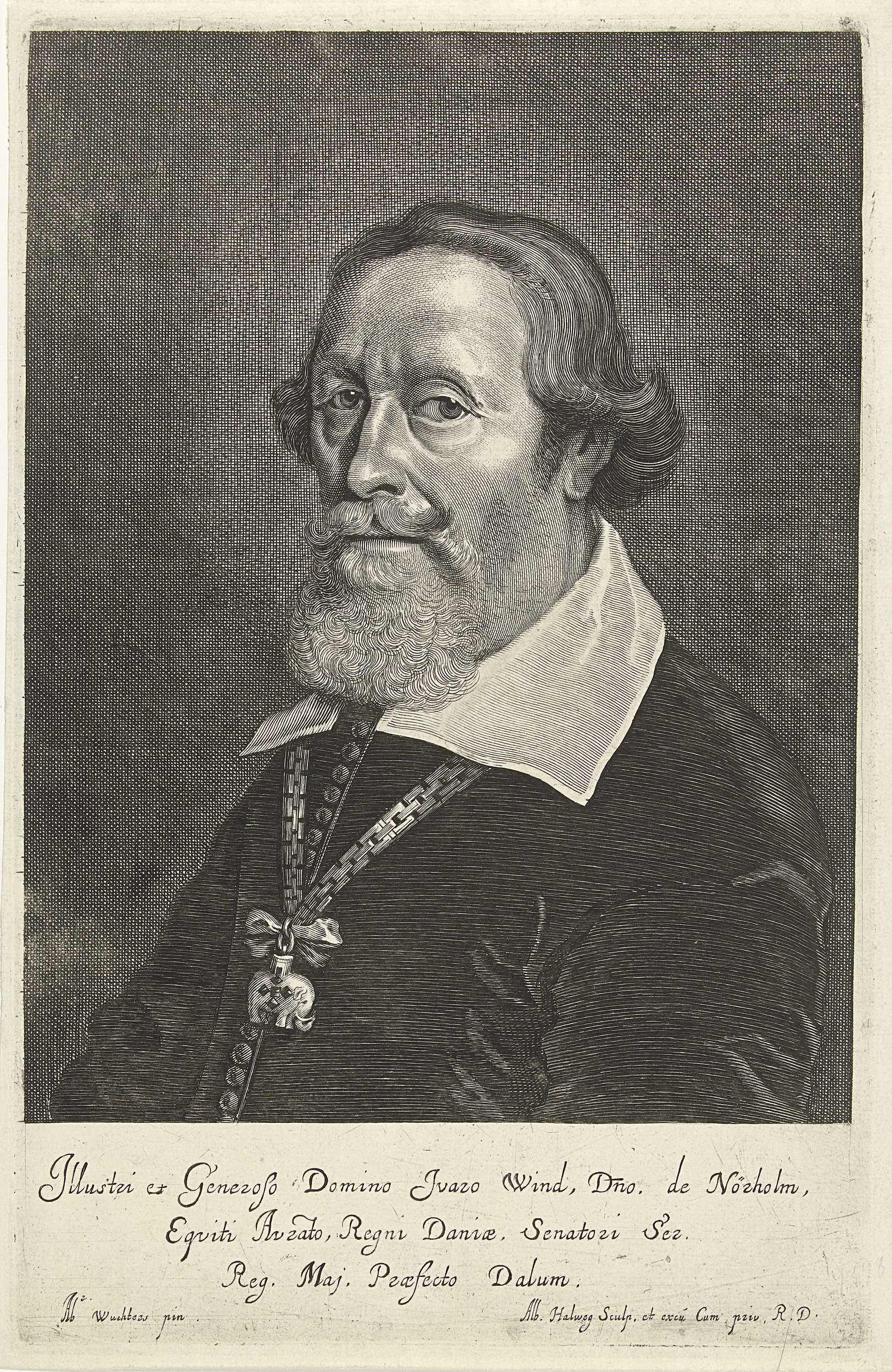
- Illustration of Vind from the 1650s
- Born: 1 June 1590; Roskilde, Denmark
- Died: 17 February 1658 (aged 67); Odense, Denmark
- Resting place: Dalum Church
- Awards: Order of the Elephant (1648)

Iver Vind (1 June 1590 – 17 February 1658) was a Danish statesman and diplomat during the reign of Christian IV. He served as chief secretary of the Danske Kancelli from 1626 and was admitted to the privy council in 1644. At Frederick III's ascension to the throne, he was created a Knight within the Order of the Elephant, but from then on played a more withdrawn role in the central administration.

== Early life and education ==
Vind was born on 1 June 1590 in Roskilde, the son of Jakob Vind of Grundet (1544–1607) and Else Jørgensdatter Høg Banner (died 1649). He was the brother of Jørgen and Henrik Vind. Iver Vind attended Roskilde Cathedral School and Sorø Academy. In 1607, he went abroad to study at the universities in Jena (1607–1608) and Basel (1608–1609). From there, he returned to Denmark by way of France and the Netherlands. Not long after his homecoming, he returned to France again in 1610.

== Career ==
In 1612, Vind was employed in the Danske Kancelli. In 1614, he was awarded a prebend at Ribe Cathedral. During the 1610s, he was sent on a number of diplomatic missions to destinations such as Brandenburg (1613), Wolfenbüttel (1613) and Russia (1614–1615). In 1616 and 1619, he attnded the diets (Danish: herredsdag) in Norway. In 1617, he accompanied Duke Frederick to Bremen and Verden. In 1619, he accompanied Christian IV to the meeting with King Gustav II Adolph in Halmstad. In 1620, he accompanied Duke Frederick on a journey to Mecklenburg. In the same year, he attended the landdag in Flensburg. In 1624, he attended Duke Ulrich's funeral in Bützow. In 1626, he was appointed chief secretary of Danske Kancelli. In the same year, he was awarded a prebend at Aarhus Cathedral. In 1631, he was also awarded a prebend at Viborg Cathedral.

In 1629, he accompanied Christian IV to another meeting with Gustav II Adolph, this time in Ulvsbäck. In 1635 and 1641, he attended the diets (herreddag) in Norway.

In 1638, he was sent to Gottorp and Sachsen-Lauenburg. In 1635 and from 1640 to 1641, he represented Christian IV in negotiations with Kirsten Munk and her mother Ellen Marsvin. In 1641, he was on board Trefoldigheden, with Christian IV, during the Action of 16 May 1644 and the Battle of Colberger Heide. In December of the same year, he was admitted to the privy council. In 1756, Anders Bille accused him of having turned the king against him.

In 1648, he attended the festivitas in Christiania in conjunction with Duke Frederick's ascension to the Danish-Norwegian throne as Frederick III. In the same year, he was created a Knight of the Order of the Elephant. After Frederick III's ascension to the throne, he was entrusted with fewer official duties. During the Swedish occupation of Odense In 1658, together with Ulrik Christian Gyldenløbe and a group of other privy councillors, he was taken prisoner by the invading Swedish troops.

== Personal life and property ==
In Odense on 17 June 1621, Vind married Helvig Skinkel (1602–1677). She was a daughter of Niels Hansen Skinkel of Gerskov and Søholm (died c. 1617) and Mette Stensdatter Bille (died c. 1636).

In 1610, Vind inherited Grundet. In 1624, he sold it to his brother Niels. In 1627, he bought Torpegård in Sønder Nærå Parish on Funen. In 1631, he bought Nørholm near Varde. He constructed a new main building on the estate (replaced by the present on in 1780). In 1636, he bought Haltrup. In 1647, he bought Agerkrog. For a while, he had also owned a stake in Klarupgård. In 1638, Vind's estates were had a combined area of 593 tønder hartkorn. In 1647, they had a combined area of 1647 tønder hartkorn.

He was also granted a number of royal fiefs. In 1729, he was granted Lister in Norway. In 1637, he exchanged it for Lundenæs. In 1645, he exchanged Lundenæs for Dalum.

Iver Vind died on 17 February 1658. He and his wife are buried in Dalum Church. The intrivately carved door to their burial chapel was executed by Anders Mortensen. An epitaph to Iver Vind and Helvig Skinkel is mounted on the wall of the church. The altarpiece was also donated to the church by the couple. In 1663, Vind and his wife donated a new pulpit to Sønder Nærå Church (aka St. Michael's Church). In 1878, his widow donated an alter set (chalice and disc; 1667 af Simon Mathiesen, Odense) and a pyx (1667, Simon Matthiesen, Odense) to the same church.

Vind and his wife were the parents of one son and three daughters. Their son Christian Vind (1630–1677) was married to Mette Iversdatter Krabbe (1635–1681), a daughter of Iver Tagesen Krabbe (1602–1666) and Karen Ottedatter Marsvin (1610–1680). Their daughter Anne Iversdatter Vind (1622–1674) was married to Arent von der Kuhla, of Løitved (1599–1658), the fiefholder of Kronborg. Their daughter Else Iversdatter Vind (b. 1625) was married to the military officer Mogens Kruse of Søndersthoved and Spøttrup (1629–1677). Their daughter Karine Iversdatter Vind (1626–1705) was married to the military officer Preben von Ahnen (1606–1675), county governor of Bratsberg and fiefholder of Nordland.

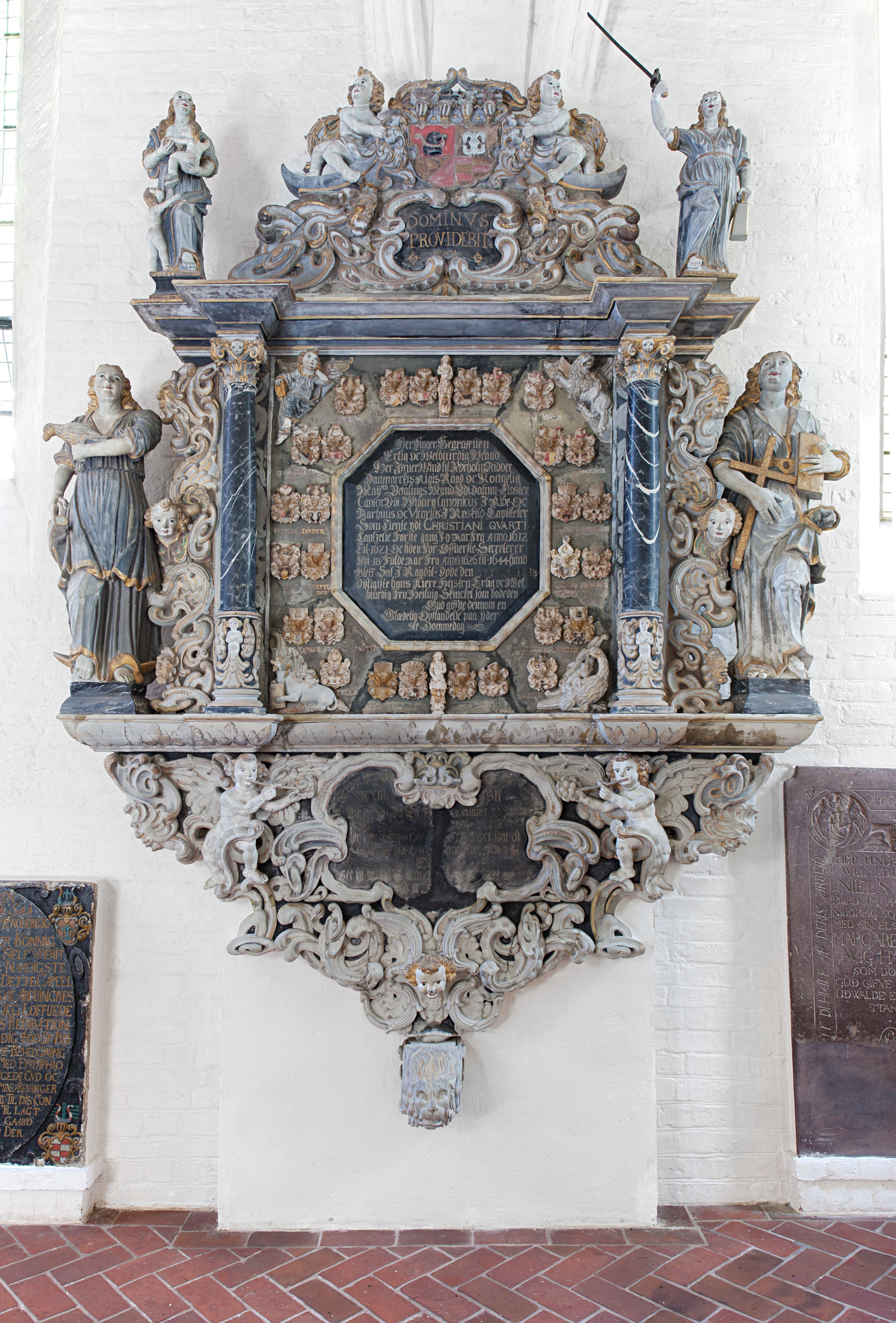
Epitaph to Iver Vind and Helvig Skinkel in Dalum Church.

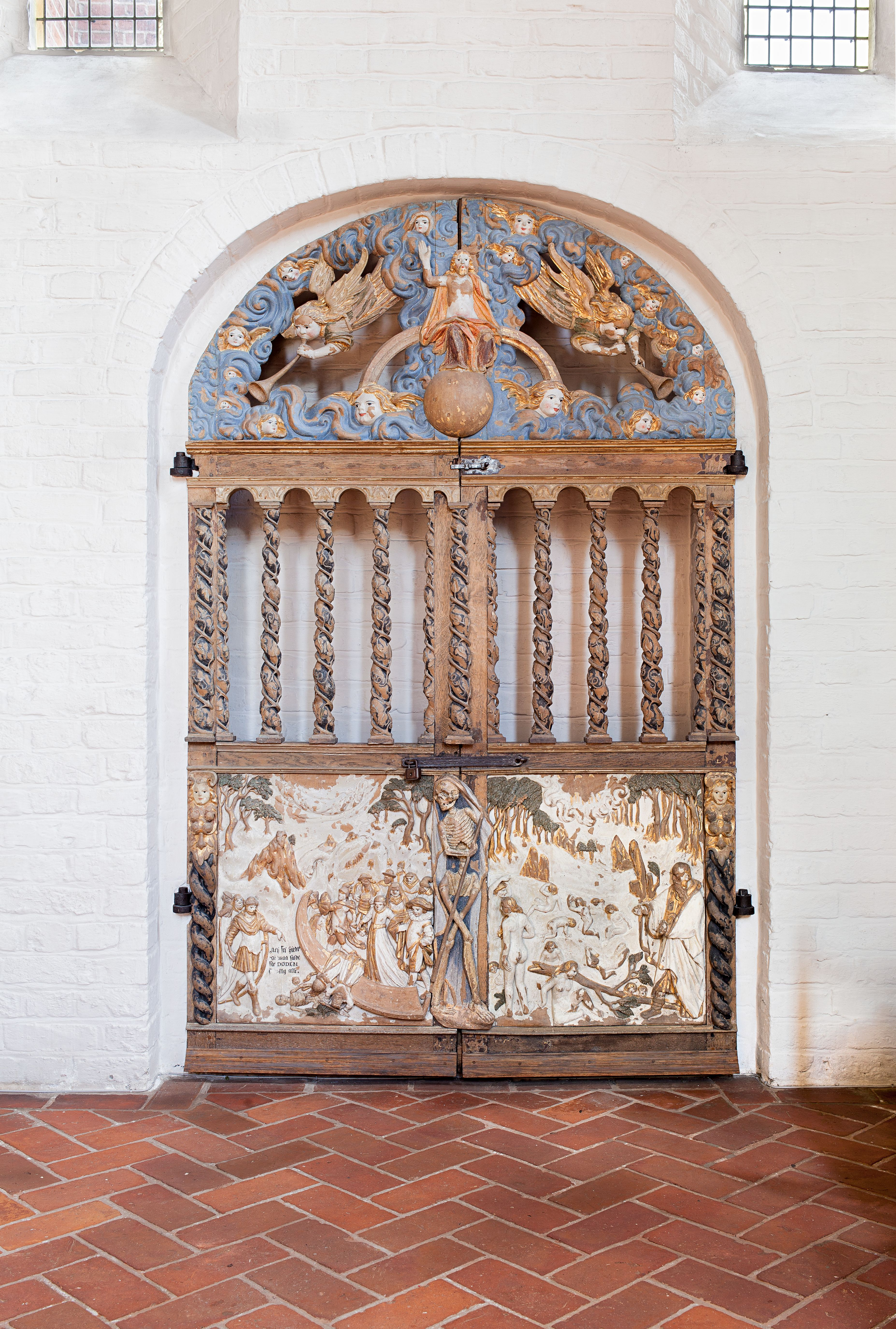
Entrance to Iver Cind's burial chapel in Dalum Church, c. 1647.

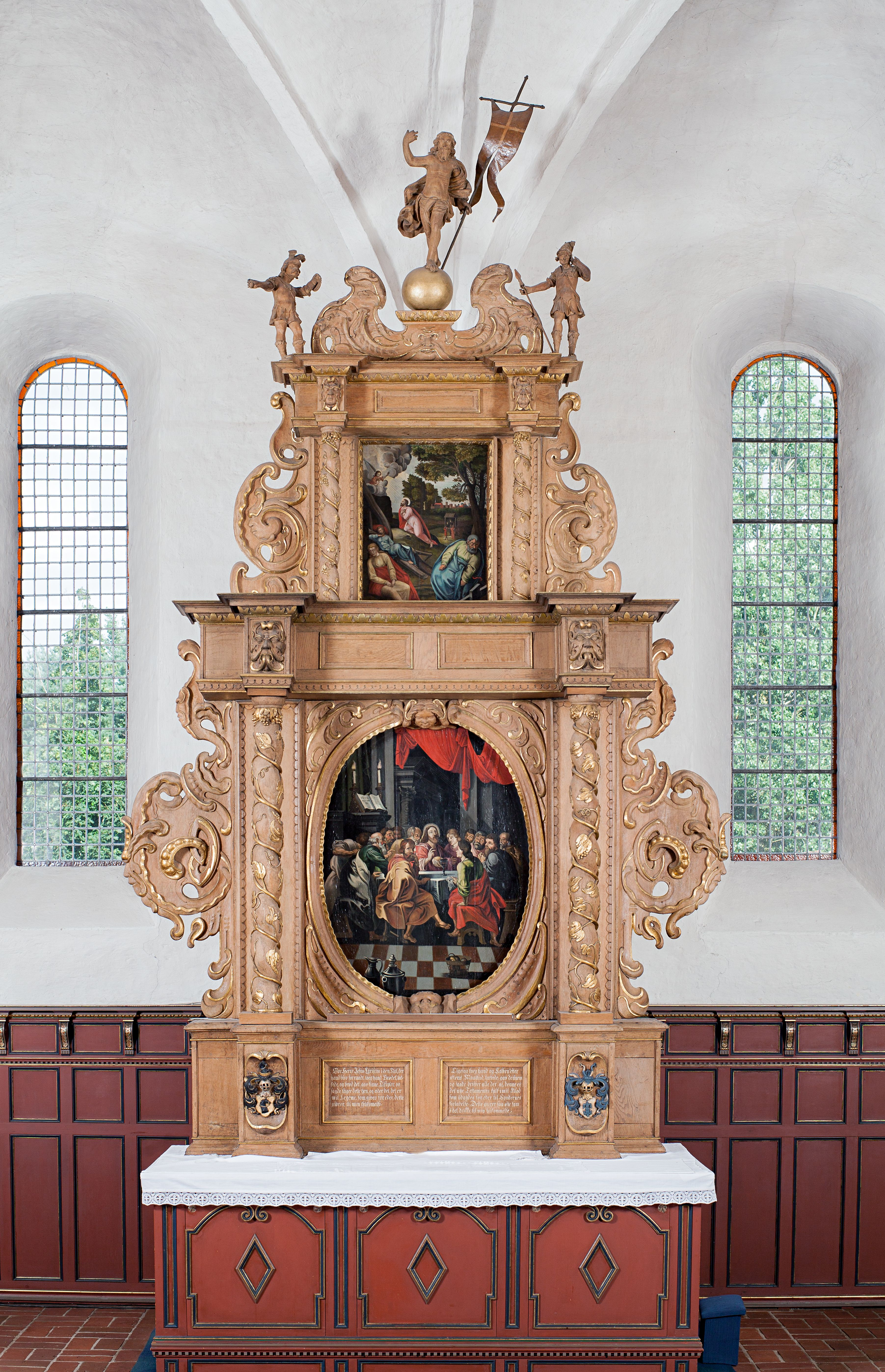
The altarpiece in Dalym Church was donated to the church by Iver Cind and Helvig Skinkel.

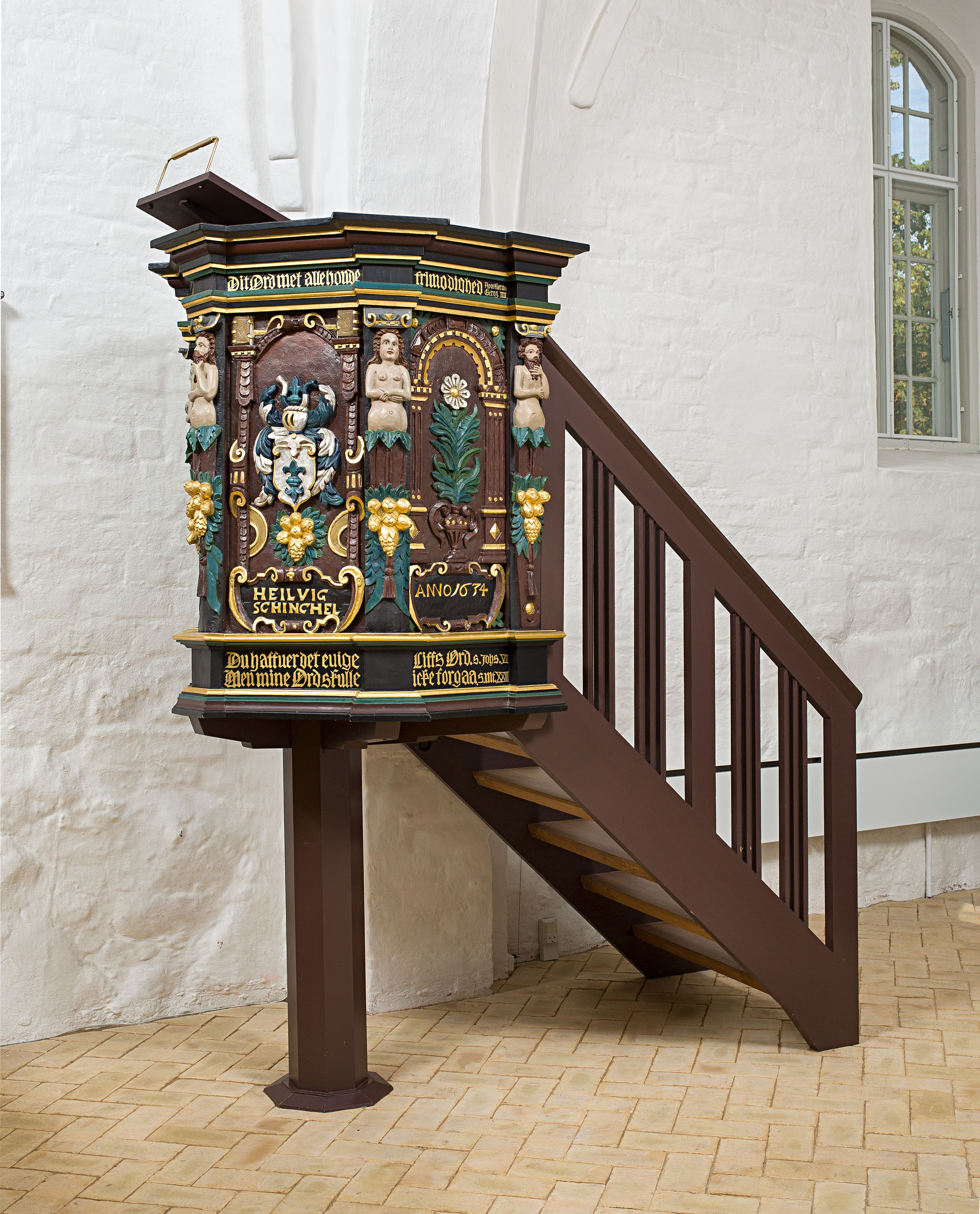
Pulpit in Sønder Nærå Church.

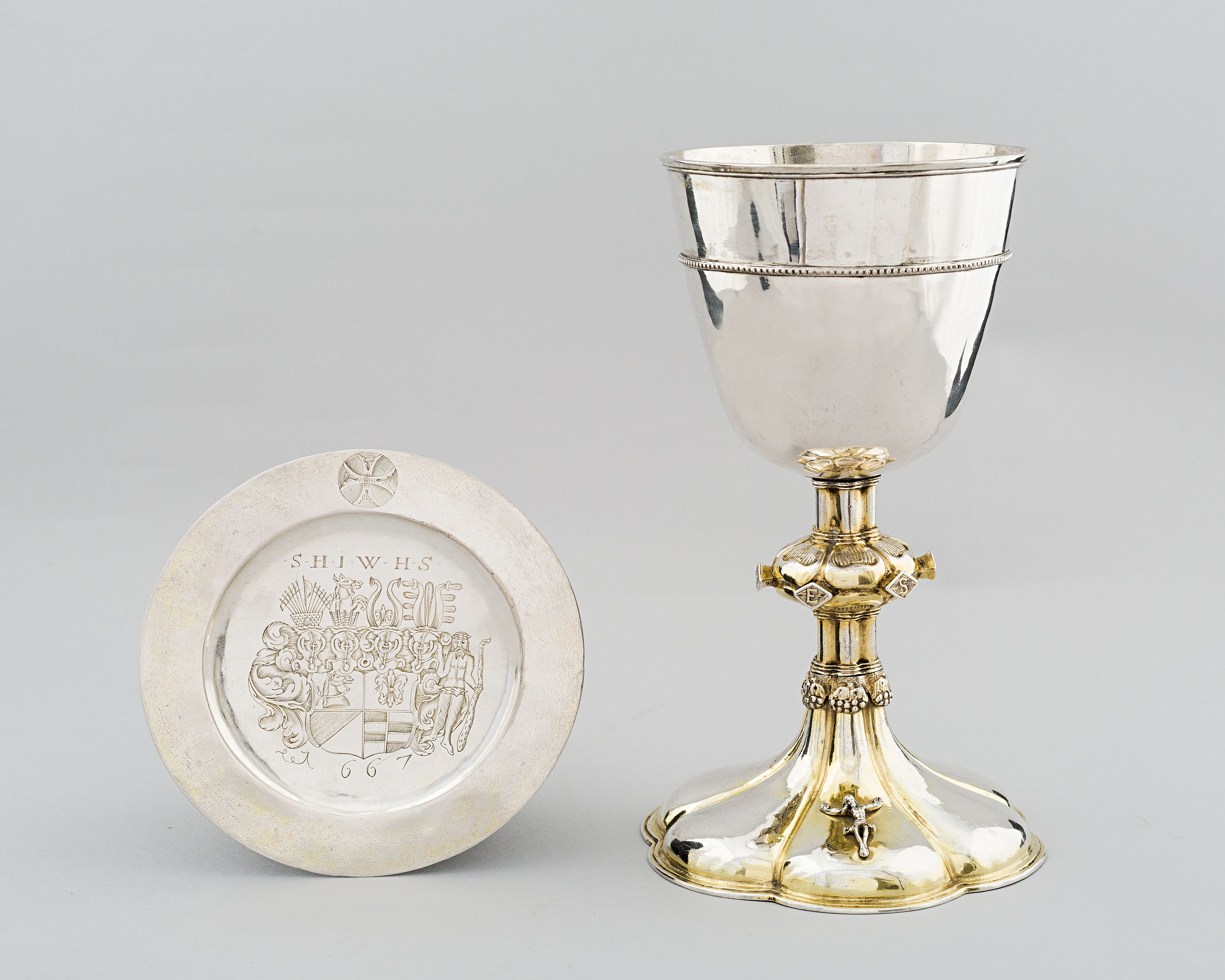
Altar set in Sønder Nærå Church.

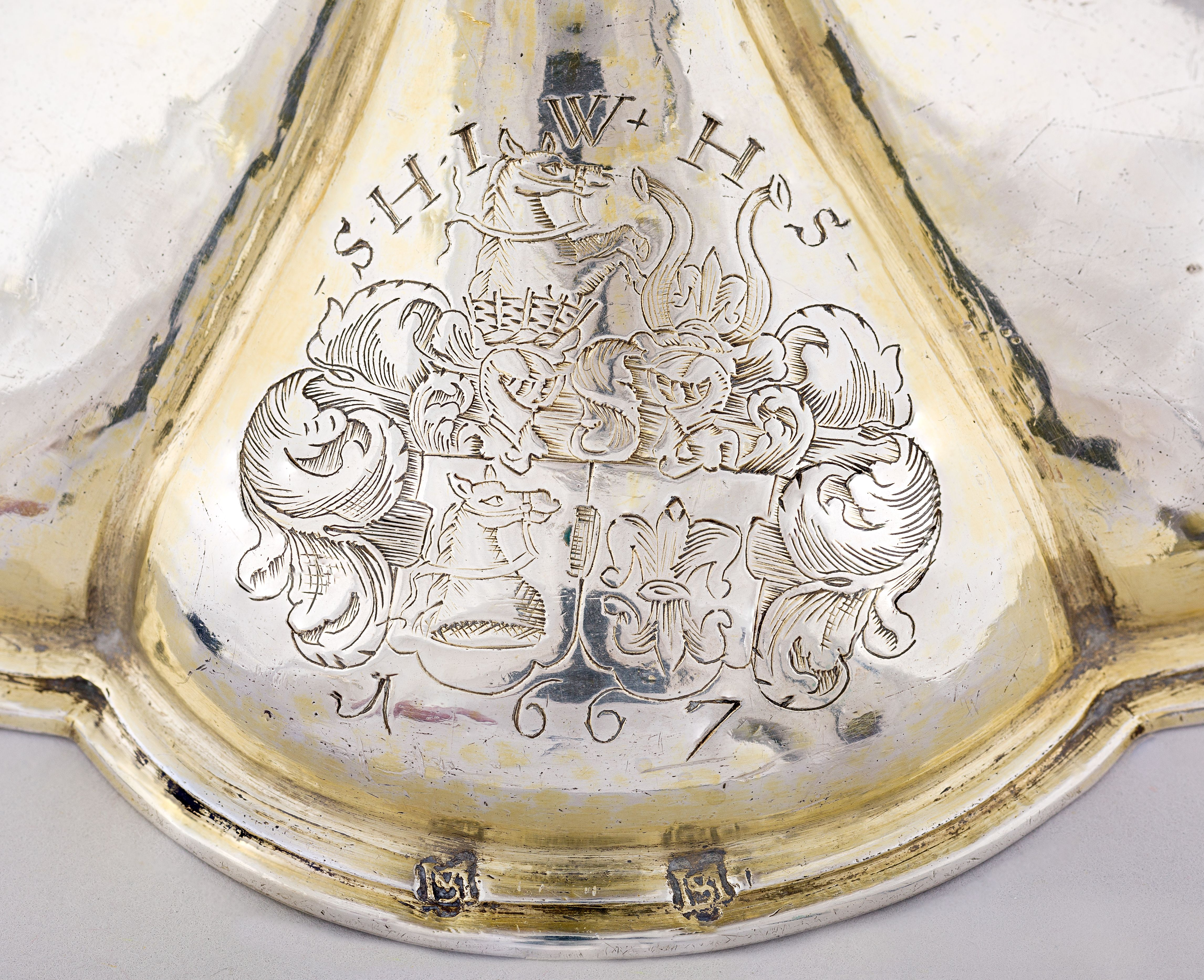
The arms of alliance of Vind and Skinkel on the foot of the challice in Sønder Nærå Church.

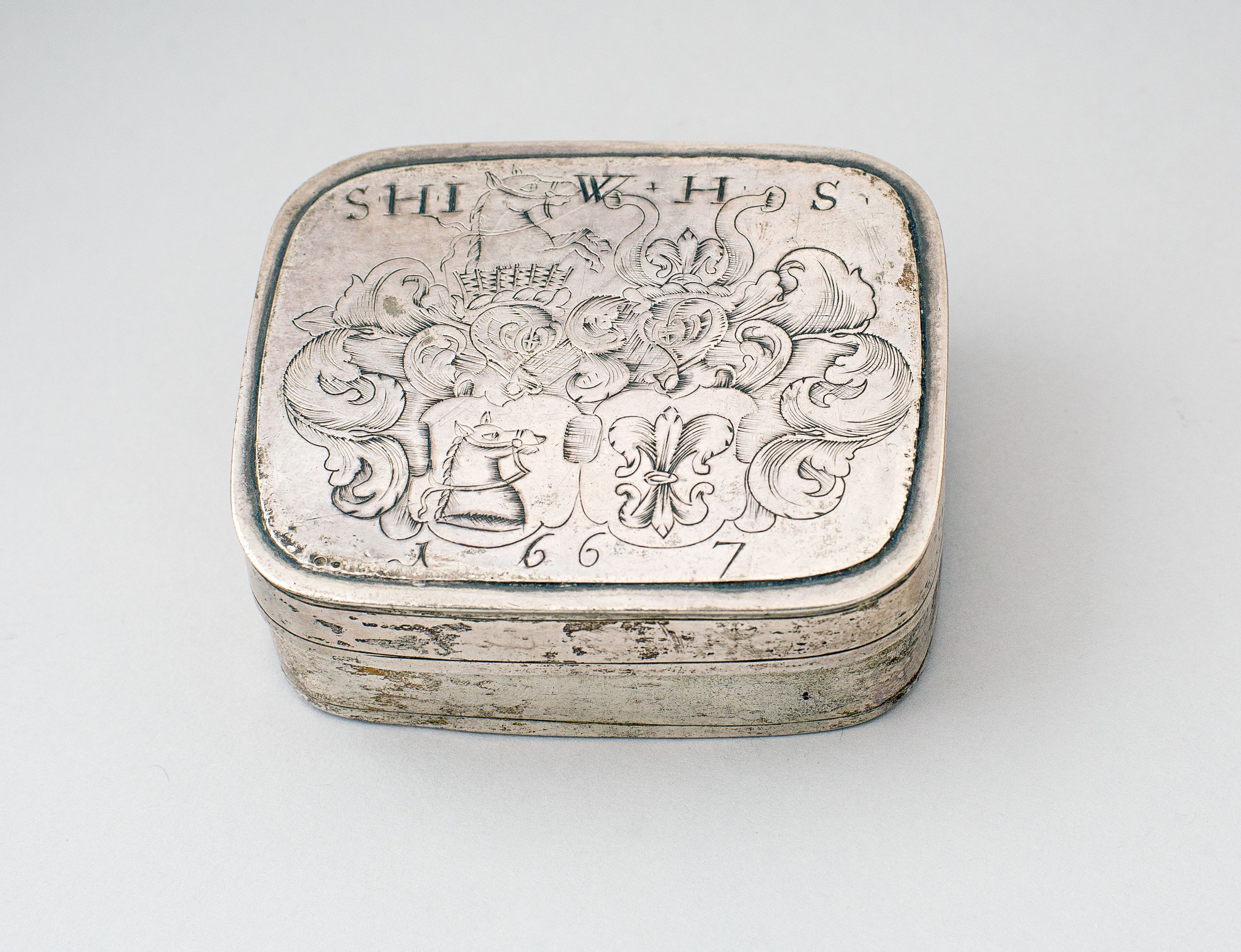
Pyx in Sønder Næså Church.
