= Nørholm, Varde Municipality =

Manor house near Holstebro, Denmark

Nørholm
- Interactive map of the Nørholm area

General information
- Location: Varde Municipality, Stokkebrovej 1, 6800 Varde, Denmark
- Coordinates: 55°41′8.7″N 8°36′0.53″E
- Completed: 1776

Nørholm is a manor house and estate situated on the banks of Varde River, north of the village of Sig, on the route between Varde and Tistrup, Varde Municipality in southwestern Denmark. The estate belonged to members of the Teilmann family from 1742 to 1979. The present Baroque style main building was constructed for Andreas Charles Teilmann in 1780. The river passes between the main building to the east and the associated home farm to the west. A half-timbered watermill from the 1790s is located approximately 200 m east of the main building. It was fed by a canal which bypasses a bend in the river. The main building, watermill and a barn were all listed on the Danish register of protected buildings and places in 1918. The scope of the heritage listing was expanded in 1964 and again in 2014. Some walls, gate pillars, a bridge and a garden pavilion are now also part of the heritage listing.

In 2025, Nørholm was acquired by the Hempel Foundation as part of its Vildmarken rewilding initiative. The estate covers 820 ha of land. The buildings are located between the protected Nørholm Heath to the south and Nørholm Forest to the north.

== History ==
=== Lange and Strangesen families ===
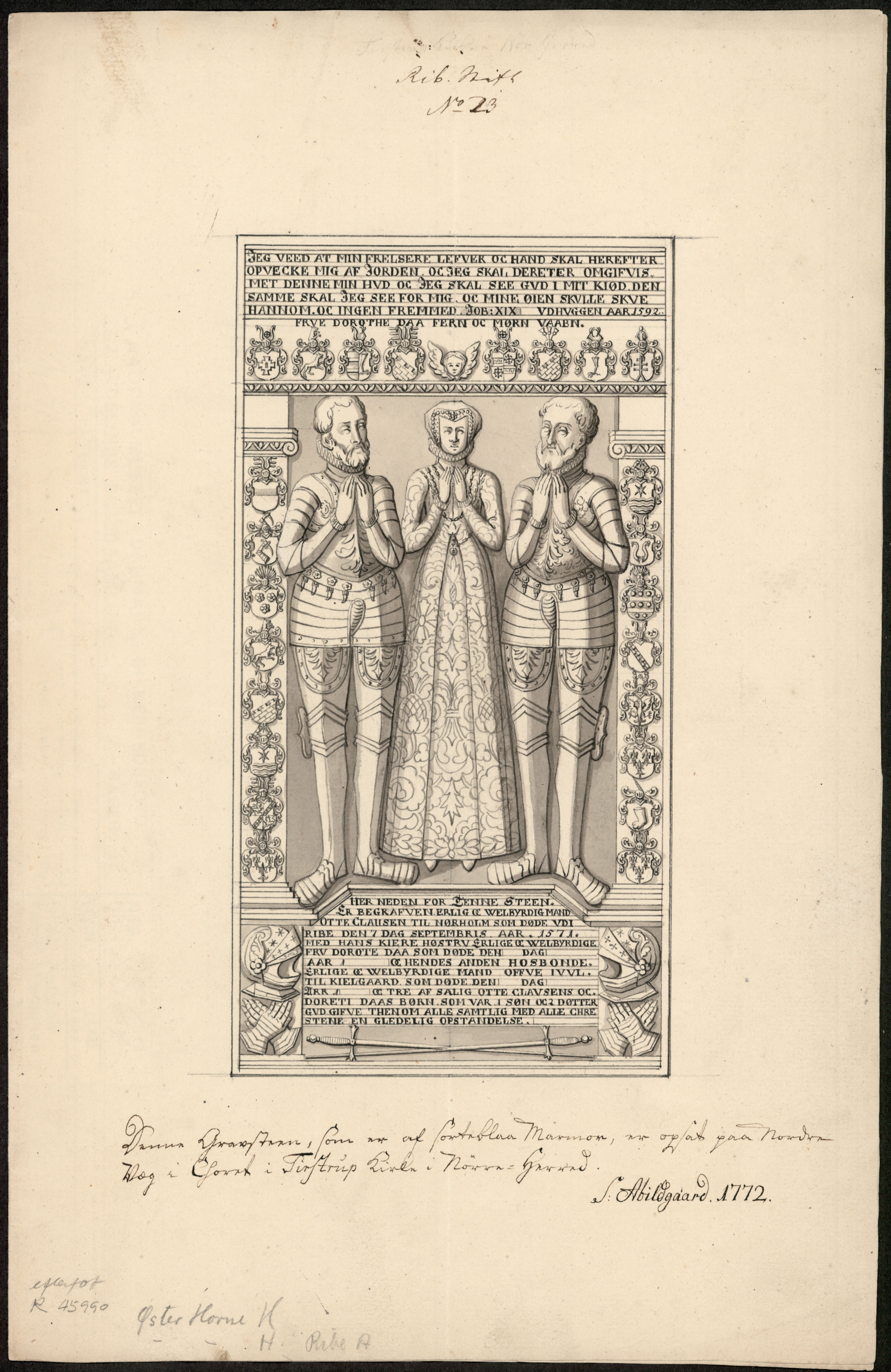
Otto Claussen's and Dorte Daa's tombstone in Tistrup Church (1592). The other man is Daa's first husband, Ove Juel. Drawing by Søren Abildgaard.

Nørholm traces its history back to the 14th century. The estate belonged to Jon Jakobsen Lange from around 1390. In 1397, he was part of the assembly that confirmed the Kalmar Union, which unified the Nordic countries under the rule of Erik of Pomerania. Lange was married to Else Jensdatter Rosenkrantz. After her husband's death, she was involved in a legal dispute with Margrethe I over the right to the estate. In 1434, it was taken over by her son, Claus Jonsen Lange.

The medieval manor, sometimes referred to as Castellum Nørholm, indicating that it was a fortified building, was located in the meadows to the north of present-day Nørholm. A watermill is first mentioned on the site in 1406.

Claus Jonsen Lange's daughter was married to Strange Nielsen Strangesen. After his death in 1488, ownership of Nørholm was divided between the sons Ebbe and Claus Strangesen. Ebbe Strangesen is remembered for his involvement in the assassination of rigshofmester Poul Laxmand in 1489.

In 1514, Christian II again claimed Nørholm as a crown estate, but the matter was not yet settled when he had to flee the country. Frederick I settled the matter in 1524 by granting Strangesen's heirs full ownership of Nørholm in return for four other farms.

Otto Clausen Strange owned Nørholm from 1537 to 1571. He is buried in the local Tirstrup Church. In 1596, Karen Strangesen brought Nørholm into her marriage with Hans Lange. He was already the owner of nearby Lunderup. In 1731, he had to sell Nørholm due to economic difficulties.

=== Vind family ===
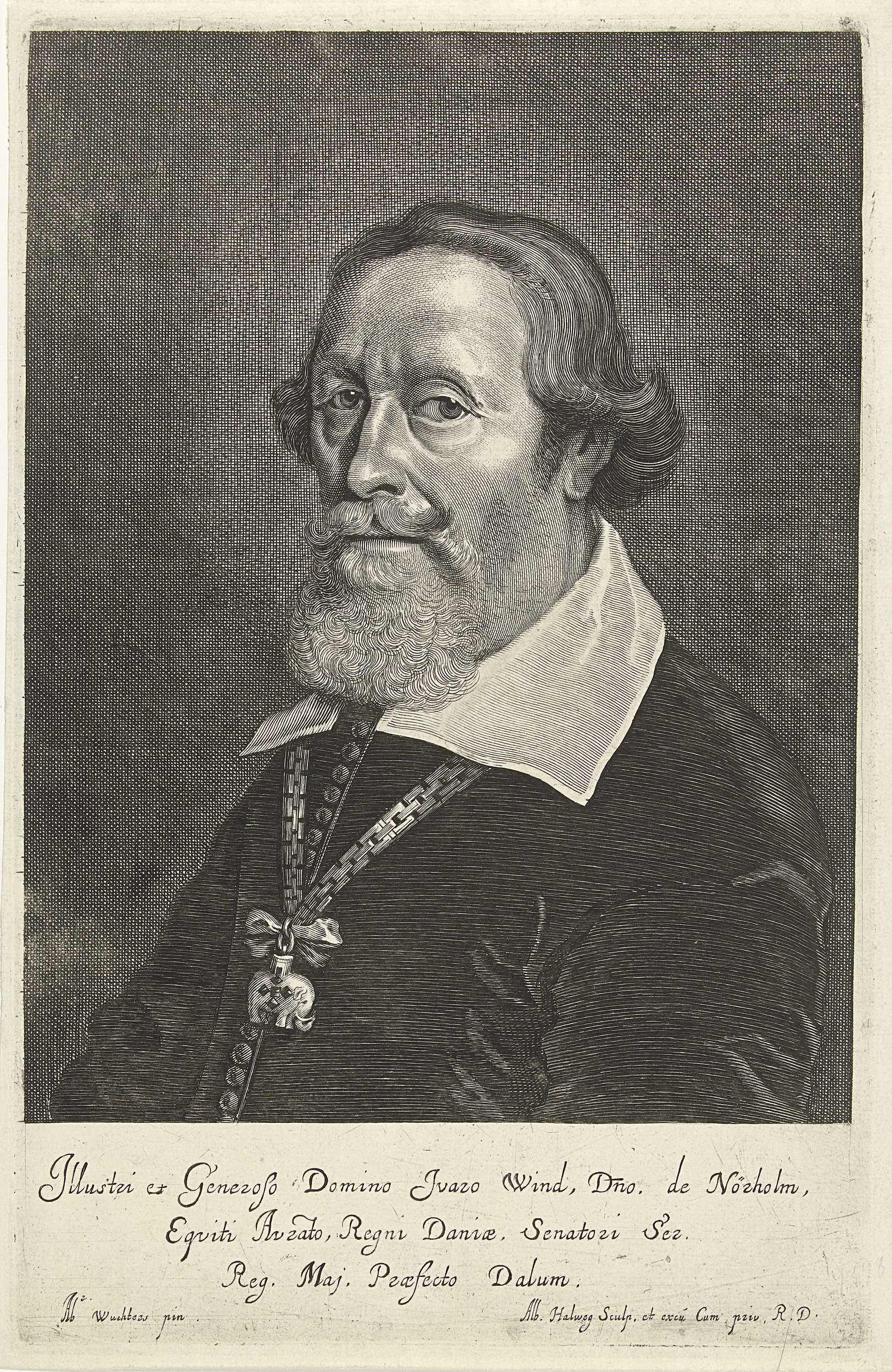
Iver Vind

In 1631, Nørholm was acquired by Iver Vind. He was the owner of a number of other estates. He constructed a new main building on the estate. He also added more land. In 1647, Nørholm was granted the status of a birk. He also engaged in the construction of a new main building.

After Vind's death in 1658, Nørholm was passed down to his son Christian. He suffered great losses during the war with Sweden in 1657–1660. After his death, Nørholm was divided between his daughter Karen Vind and widow, Mette Krabbe, who would later marry secondly to Frederik von Lützow. Karen Vind was married to Christian Bille, who was heavily in debt. Some of the land was therefore sold off, resulting in Nørholm losing its tax privileges in 1682 and its birk rights in 1687.

=== Lassen and Ehrenfeld families ===
One of Christian Vind's largest creditors was Jens Lassen (c. 1625–1706). Towards the end of the century, he took over what remained of the estate. As a merchant, he had been responsible for large-scale supplies to the crown. He had also served as a Supreme Court justice and as county judge on Gunen. His other estates included Harritslevgård, Krumstrup and Skt. Knuds kloster on Funen, Egense kloster and Grubbesholm in Jutland and 1680–88 Kærgårdsholm on Zealand. By expanding the estate, Lassen was able to restore its lost tax freedom and birk rights (1701). In 1701, he bought Thorstrup, Hodde, Tistrup and Ansager churches from the crown. Due to his poor maintenance of the two churches, he lost the patronage, which then reverted to the crown.

After Lassen's death in 1706, his estates were divided among his sons. Nørholm passed to his son Frederik (died 1736). He reacquired the patronage of the four churches in 1726, shortly prior to parting with the estate.

In 1726, Nørholm (churches included) was sold by auction to Stephen Nielsen Ehrenfeld. In 1719, he had been ennobled. Prior to this, he had also acquired Endrupholm and Lunderup. He was married to Maren Schultz.

=== Teilmann family ===
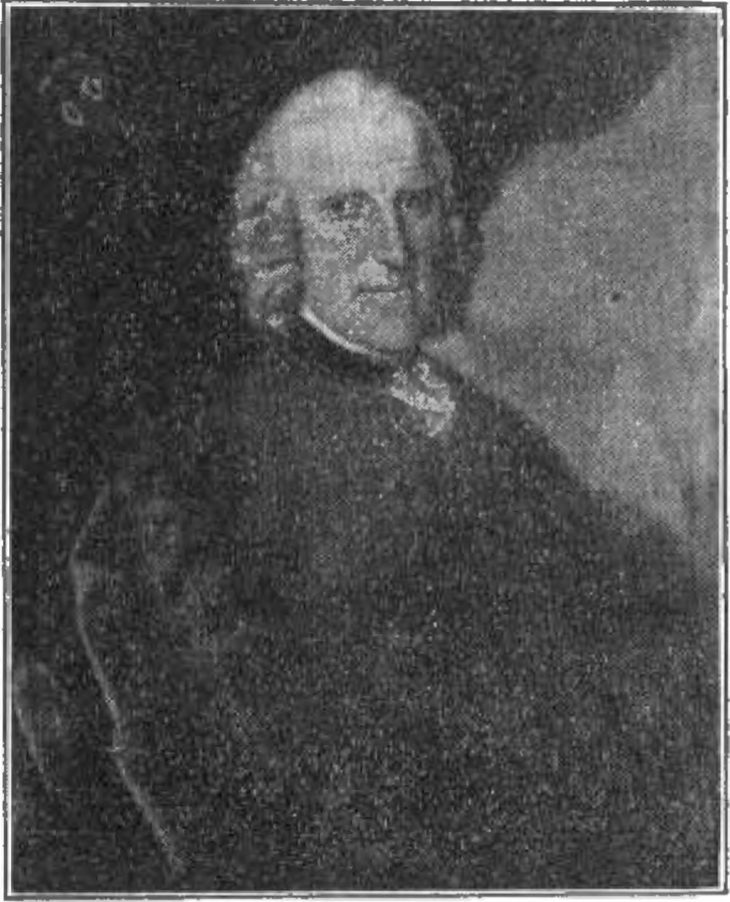
Andreas Charles Teilmann

After her husband's death in 1741, Maren Ehrenfeld (née Schiltz) married secondly to Christian Hans Teilmann, who served as country governor of Lundenæs and Bøvling counties, He was the owner of Skrumsager.

After Teilmann's death, his estates were divided between his three surviving sons. The eldest son had joined the Royal Navy and died off of Florida's coast. Nørholm went to Andreas Charles Teilmann. He immediately embarked on improving the management of the estate, both by draining the soil and by undertaking soil melioration though the addition of marl. In 1851, he and his brothers were all ennobled by letters patent. Between 1759 and 1766, he constructed a new home farm. In 1776–1780, he also constructed a new main building. The mew main building was most likely constructed with the assistance of the Varde-based master builder Peder Frisvad. Teilmann established a brickyard and a pottery on the estate. The pottery was a major manufacturer of so-called jydepotter (Jutland pots). The brickyard was later moved to Lunderup. Cattle was exported by ship to the Netherlands.

Prior to his death, he converted Nørholm into an entailed estate (stamhus) for his niece, Christine Marie Rosenørn, who adopted the compound name Rosenørn-Teilmann.

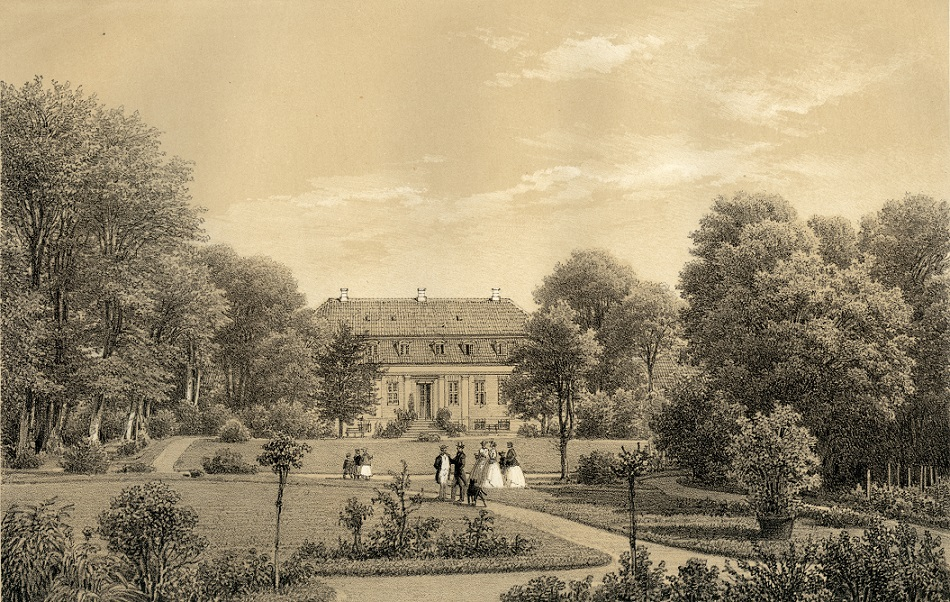
Nørholm depicted by Ferdinand Richardt

After her death, Nørholm passed to her daughter. In 1848, it was passed to her nephew da:Theodor Rosenørn-Teilmann, who was active in politics, both as a member of Landstinget and as a government minister. He sold much of the land. The money from the sale was tied up in a family trust (fideikommiskapital) in association with the entailed estate. After Rosenørn-Teilmann's death, Nørholm passed to his daughter da:Ingeborg Christiane Rosenørn-Teilmann. She was a writer. For more than 30 years, she lived at Nørholm with the composer Elisabeth Boisen. In 1922, Nørholm was converted into a freehold.

After Ingeborg Rosenørn-Teilmann's death, Nørholm passed to her nephew Frederik Rosenørn-Lehn.

=== Later history ===
In 1979, Carl Frederik Gustav Rosenørn-Lehn sold the estate to Karl Kristian Nielsen. In 2025, he sold it to the Hempel Foundation.

== Architecture ==
The main building is an 11-bay-long, single story building constructed in yellow brick from Teilmann's own brickyard. It stands on a foundation of granite ashlars. The transition from the plinth to the masonry is marked by a projecting band of red sandstone. The building is topped by a Mansard roof clad in black-glazed tile. The roof ridge is pierced by three chimneys. The east side of the Mansard roof features eight dormer windows. The principal (western) facade features a three-bay median risalit with pilasters and crowned by a triangular pediment with a sandstone relief featuring Teilmann's coat of arm. An inscription commemorates that the building was constructed in 1780 by Andreas Charles Teilmann. Above the main entrance is a hood mould supported by corbels. Between the hood mould and the portal runs a Vitruvian scroll. Above the hood mould runs a belt course. The cornice and the upper brick-layer of a belt course above the hood mould are white-painted. The east side of the building features two corner risalits, each of them with an entrance to the walk-out basement with many of the same decorative elements as the main entrance on the other side of the building. The central doorway on this side of the building is accented by a sandstone portal with a stone tablet with the inscription "Andreas Charles Teilmann".

The main wings are flanked by two lower secondary wings. The northern of these secondary wings is attached to a perpendicular east wing, which is again attached to another perpendicular wing.

The two-storey watermill is constructed with timber framing and yellow-plastered infills. It has a thatched roof. The park features a number of monuments. One of them commemorates Andreas Charles Teilmann. Another one commemorates the reunification of Denmark with Sønderjylland in 1920.

== Today ==
Nørholm has an area of 820 hectares. As of 2026, 260 ha was farmland, 210 ha was woodland and 350 ha was heatherland. As a consequence of the Hempel Foundation's plans for the area, it will be subject to rewilding and restoration of the semi-natural heatherland through all-year grazing.

A 350 ha portion of Nørholm Heath was already protected in 1013 at the initiative of Ingeborg Rosenørn-Teilmann. The protected area was later expanded with Linding Å (1965) and Nørholm Skov (1993).

== List of owners ==
- ( -1404)Jon Jakobsen Lange
- (1404–1434) Else Jensdatter Rosenkrantz, gift Lange
- (1406–1524) Kronen
- (1434- ) Claus Jonsen Lange
- (1441–1488) Strange Nielsen Strangesen
- (1488–1507) Ebbe Strangesen
- (1488–1511) Claus Strangesen
- (1511- ) Niels Clausen
- (1537–1571) Otto Clausen
- ( -1596) Claus Strangesen
- (1596–1631) Hans Lange
- (1631–1658) Iver Vind
- (1658–1677) Christian Vind
- (1677- ) Mette Krabbe, gift 1) Vind, 2) Lützow
- (1677- ) Christian Bille
- (1677- ) Frederik von Lützow
- (1684- ) Hans Wandal
- (1686–1687) Otto Kruse
- ( -1706) Jens Lassen
- (1706–1726) Frederik Lassen
- (1726–1741) Stephen Nielsen Ehrenfeld
- (1741–1742) Maren Schultz, gift 1) Ehrenfeld, 2) Teilmann
- (1742–1749) Christian Teilmann
- (1749–1790) Andreas Charles Teilmann
- (1790–1812) Christian Rosenørn-Teilmann
- (1812–1817) Christine Marie Teilmann, gift Rosenørn
- (1817–1861) Ingeborg Christiane Rosenørn
- (1861–1879) da:Theodor Rosenørn-Teilmann
- (1879–1929) da:Ingeborg Kristiane Rosenørn-Teilmann
- (1929–1951) Frederik Rosenørn-Lehn
- (1951–1979) Carl Frederik Gustav Rosenørn-Lehn
- (1979-present) Kar l Kristian Nielsen og Martha Braüner Nielse* n
