= Lokaltog =

Danish railway company

Lokaltog A/S
- Type: Aktieselskab
- Founded: 2015
- Headquarters: Hillerød, Denmark
- Area served: Denmark
- Services: Passenger transportation
- Website: http://www.lokaltog.dk/

Lokaltog A/S (English: Local Trains Ltd) is a Danish railway company responsible for train operation and related passenger services on nine local railways on the islands of Zealand, Lolland and Falster in Denmark. The company was formed on 1 July 2015 as a merger of Lokalbanen A/S and Regionstog A/S. Movia owns a part of Lokaltog, whereas buses are owned by companies, subcontractors, that are paid by this transit agency to drive according to contract.

== Railway lines ==
Lokaltog is responsible for train operation and related passenger services on nine local railways with a combined length of 338 km (210 mi) on the islands of Zealand, Lolland and Falster.

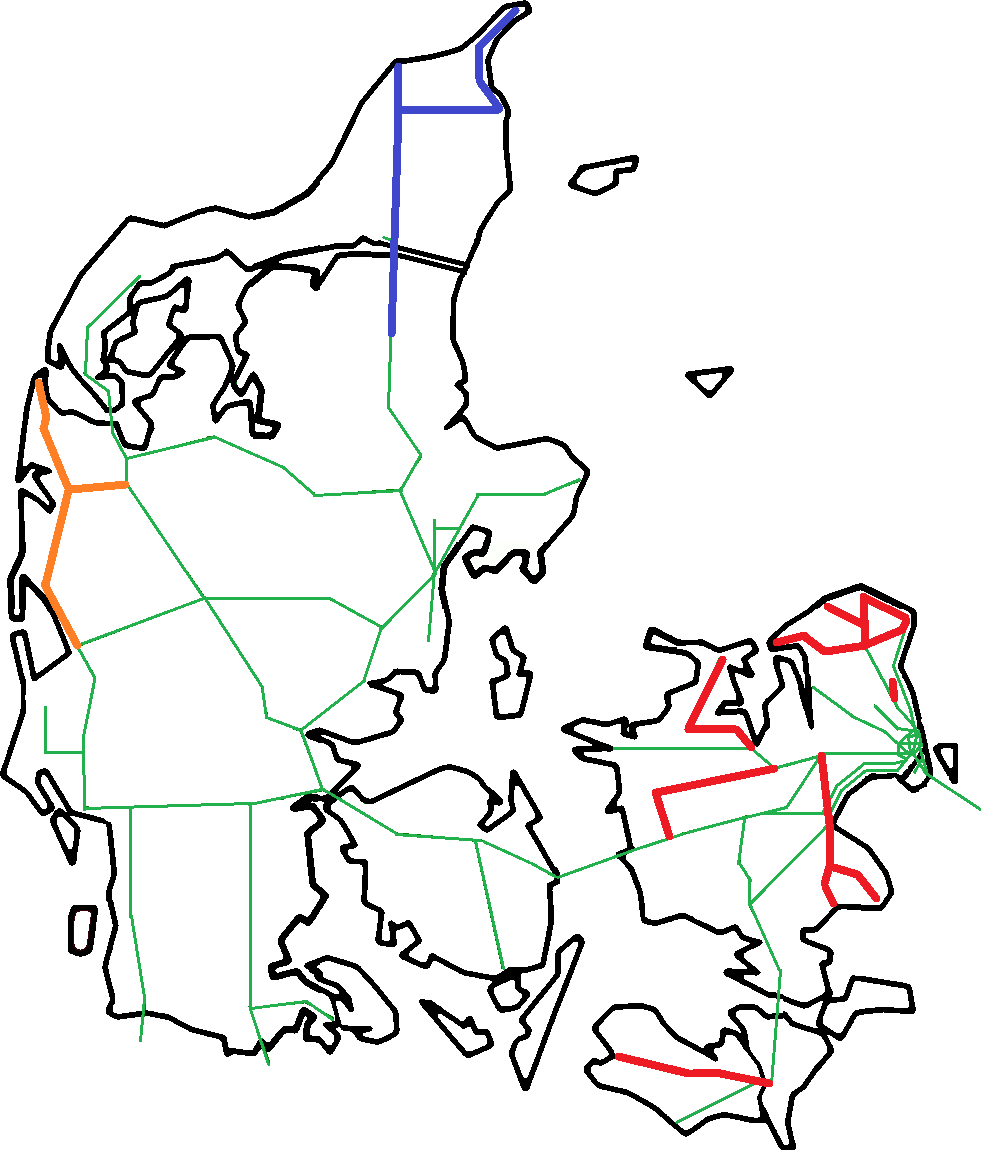
Private railways 2021–present day.

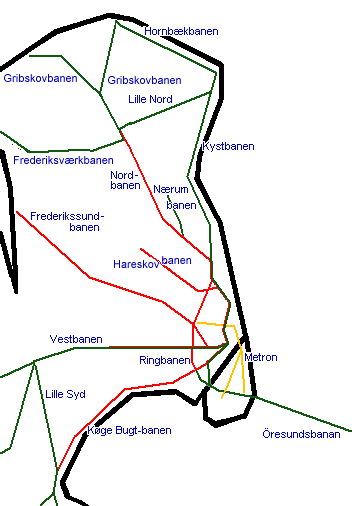
The local lines and DK-Copenhagen-the track network.

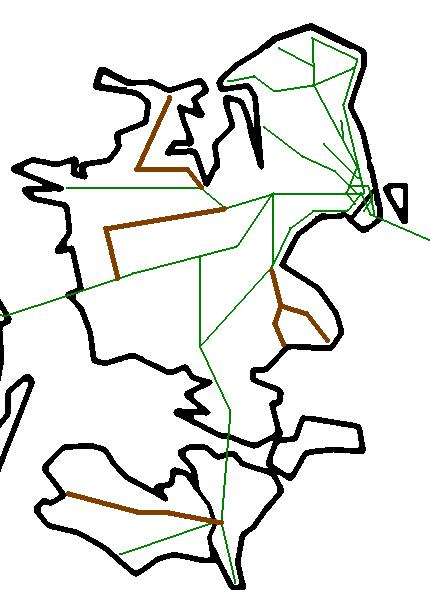
Map of railway lines on the island of Zealand, Denmark. Red/Brown lines indicate lines operated by Lokaltog.

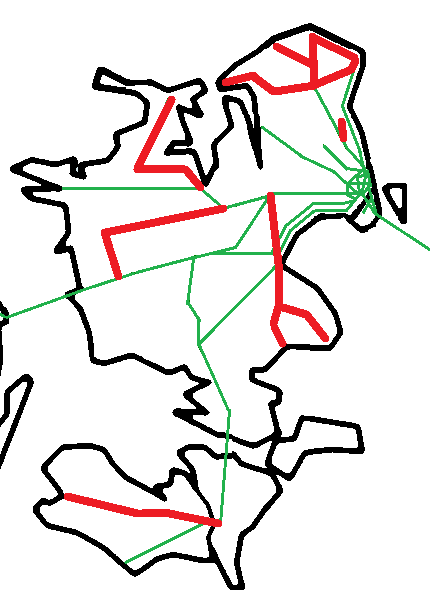
Lokaltog 2021-present day.

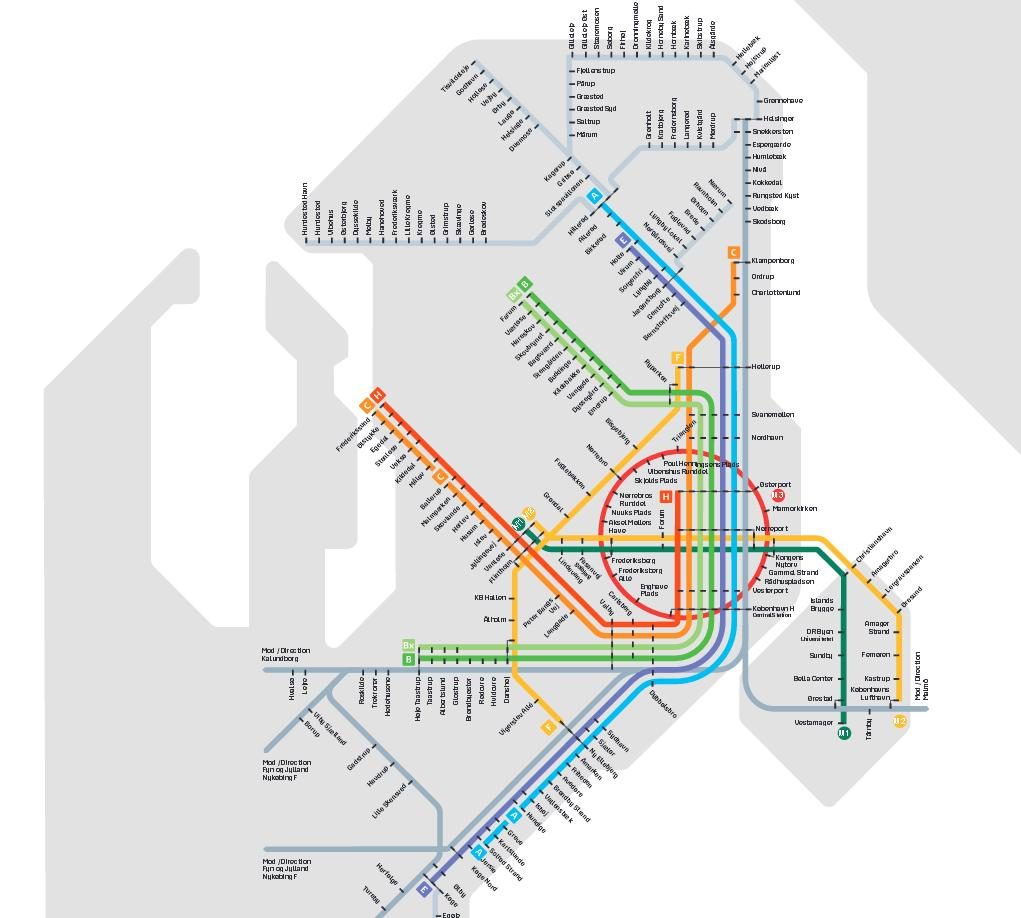
Some of local lines in a light grey color in the north part of Zealand and in the south part of Zeland, lines operated by Lokaltog.

	Train number	Railway line	Termini	Length	No. of stations
1	920R / 920E	Frederiksværk Line	Hillerød-Hundested	36.3 km (22.6 mi)	16
2	950R / 960R	Gribskov Line	Hillerød-Tisvildelje(960R) / Gilleleje(950R)	25 km (16 mi)	19
3	940R	Hornbæk Line	Helsingør-Gilleleje	25 km (16 mi)	19
4	930R	Little North Line	Hillerød-Helsingør	20.8 km (12.9 mi)	9
5	910	Nærum Line	Jægersborg-Nærum	7.8 km (4.8 mi)	9
6	510R	Odsherred Line	Holbæk-Nykøbing Sjælland	49.4 km (30.7 mi)	15
7	410	Tølløse Line	Tølløse-Slagelse	50.8 km (31.6 mi)	12
8	110R / 210R	East Line	Roskilde/Køge/Hårlev-Faxe Ladeplads (110R) / Rødvig (210R)	46.2 km (28.7 mi)	20
9	710R	Lolland Line	Nykøbing Falster-Nakskov	50.2 km (31.2 mi)	9

Railways 1-4 are railways located at North Zealand, number 5 in the table, is an urban line in the northernmost of Copenhagen. Number 6-9 are railways located south of or west of the Danish Capital city.

== Rolling stock ==
=== IC2 trains ===
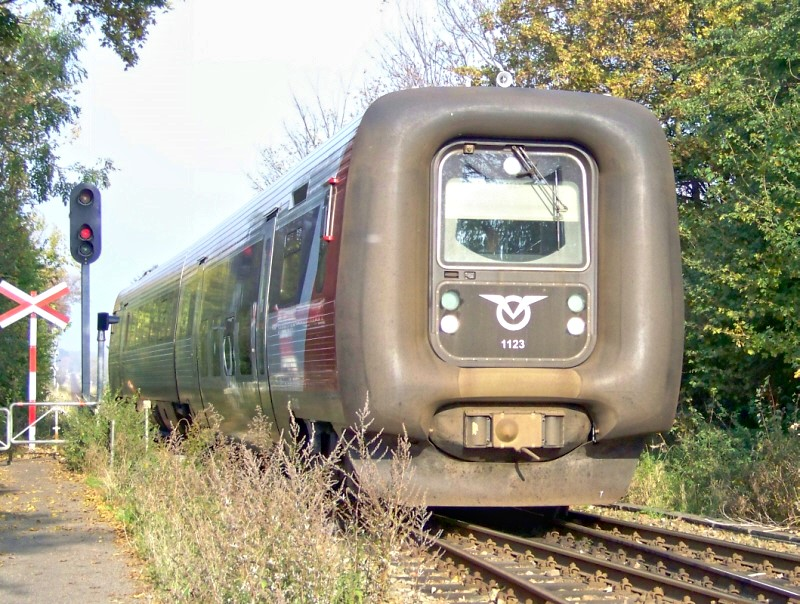
IC2 1123.

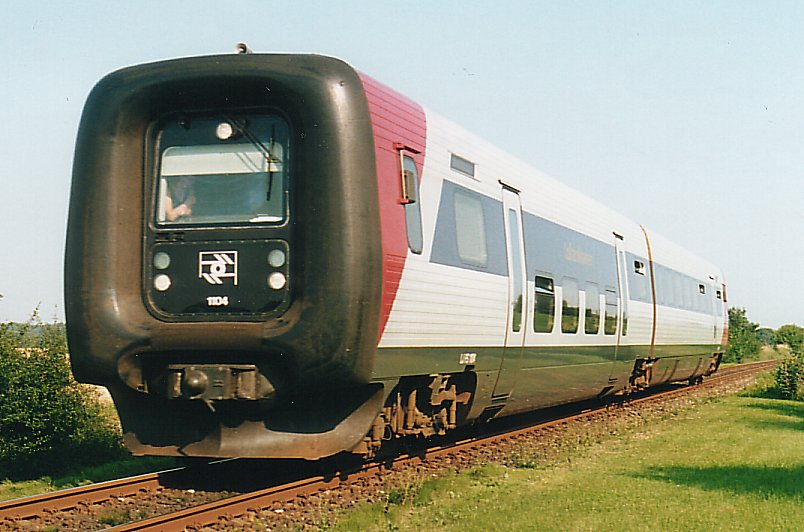
IC2 1104 on Lollandsbanen.

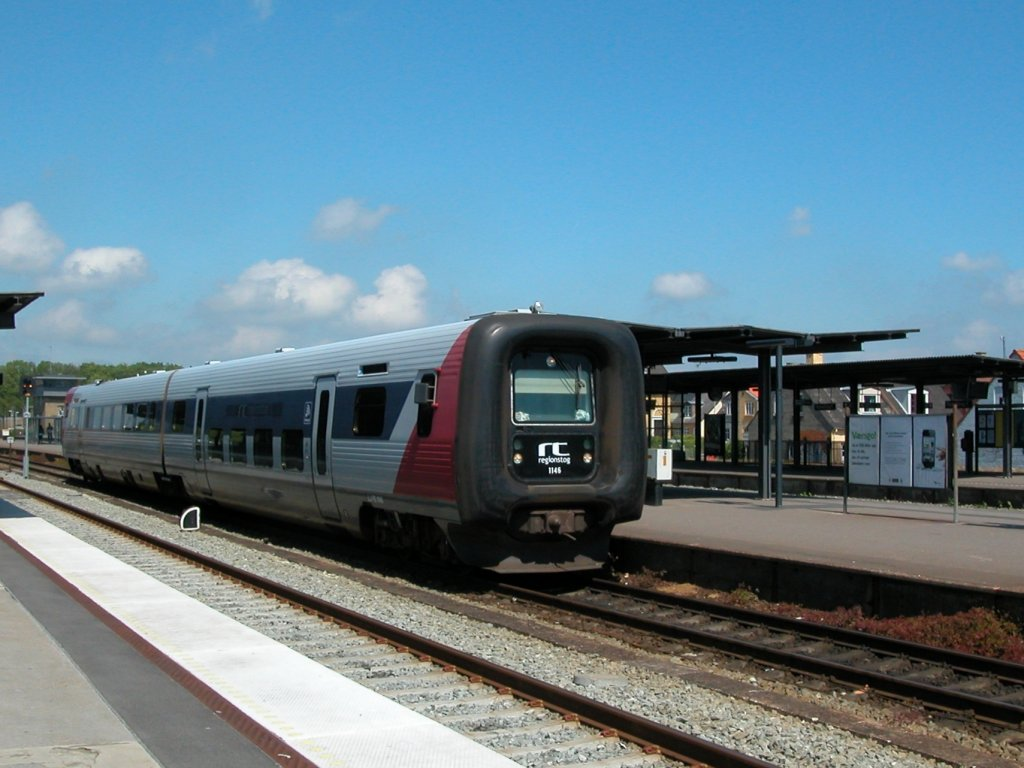
IC2 1146, Regional train, Lollandsbanen.

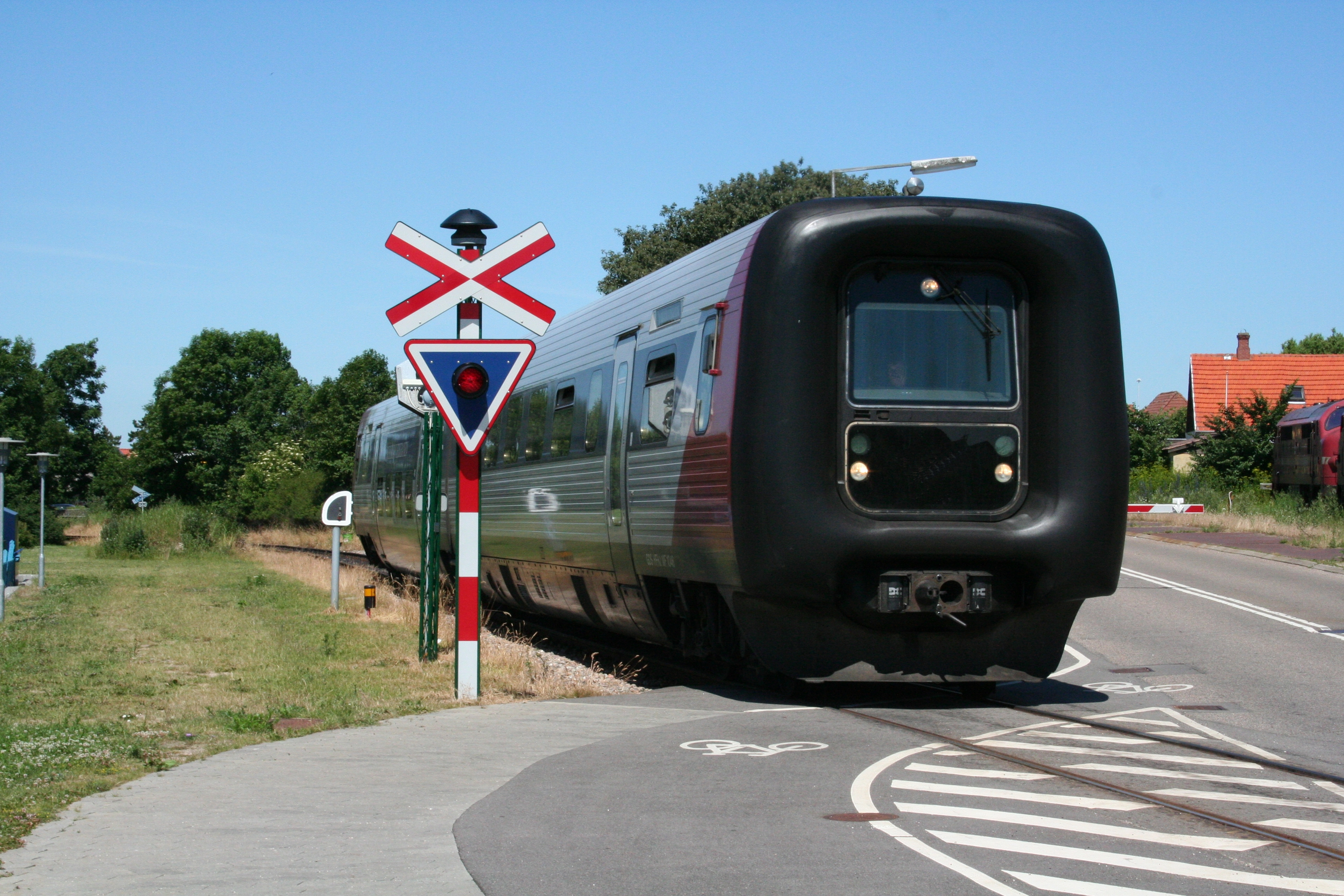
IC2 at Hundested-Hundested Station.

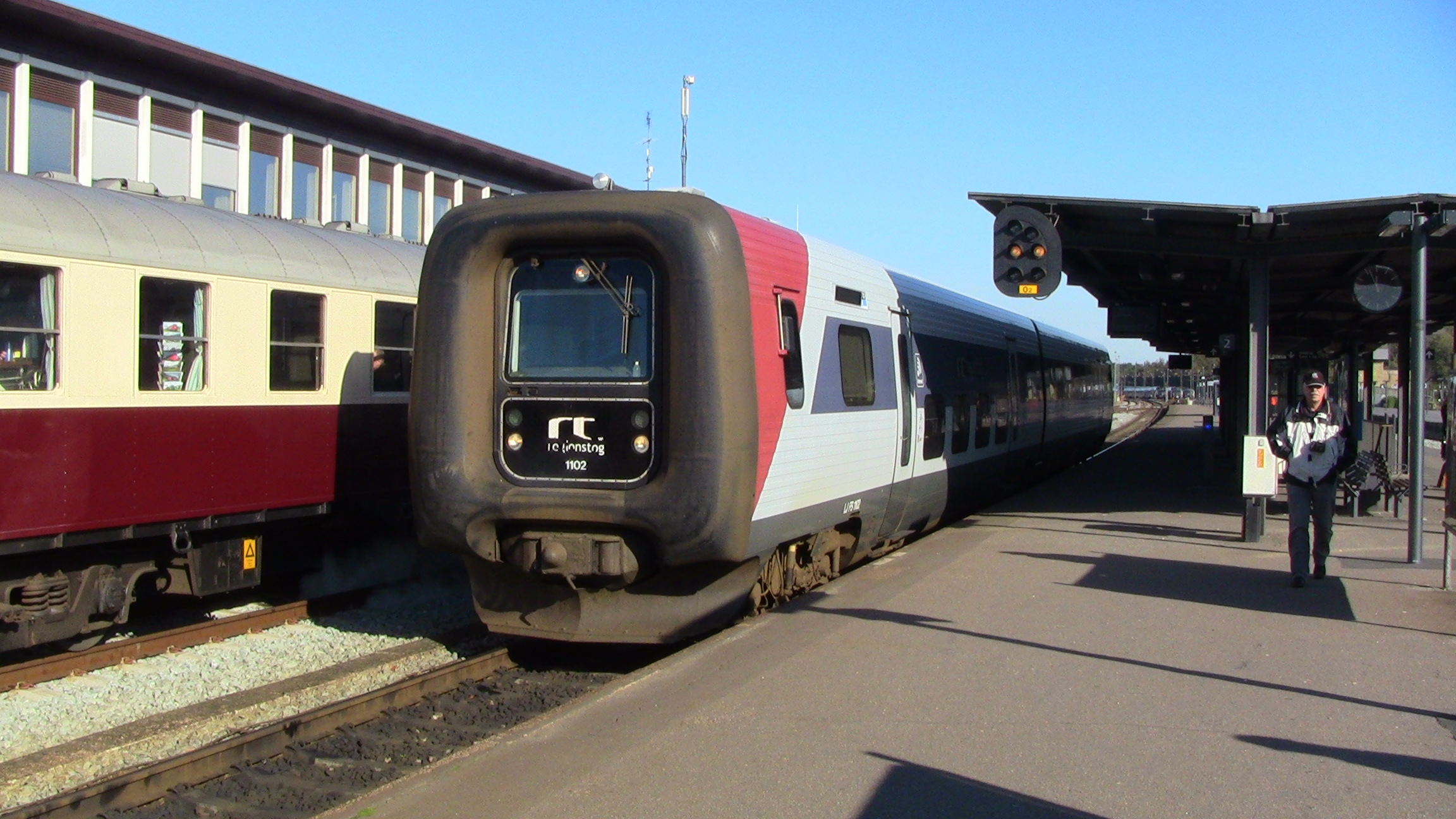
IC2 Regional train, IC2 1102.

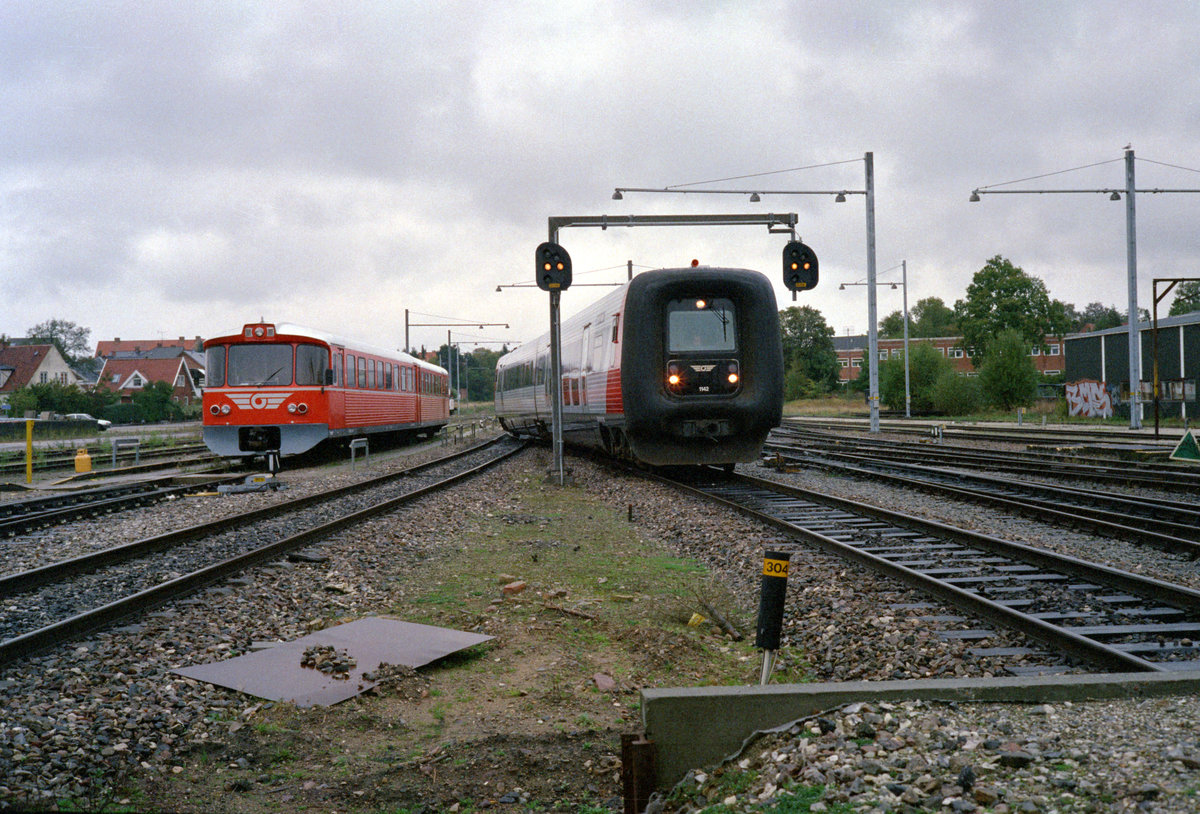
An IC2 train on Gribskovbanen, IC2 1142.

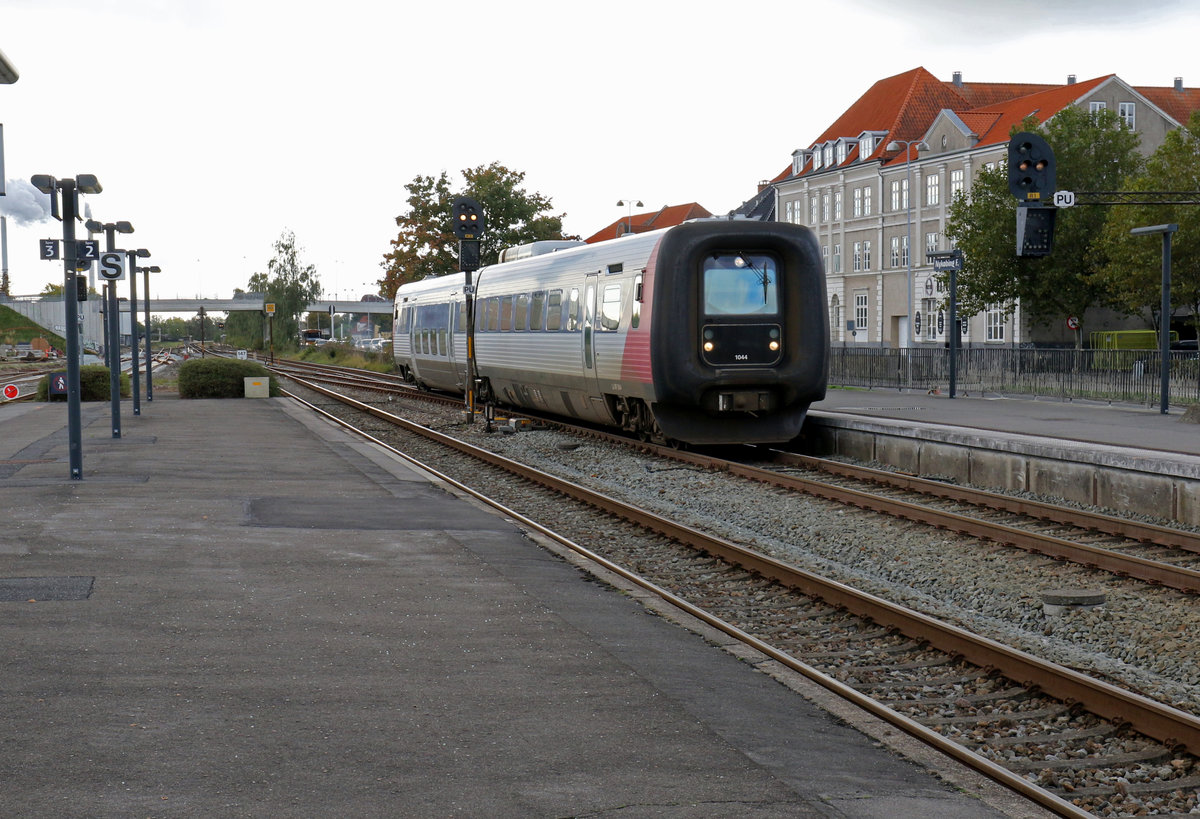
IC2 1044 at Nykøbing Falster Station, Lollandsbanen

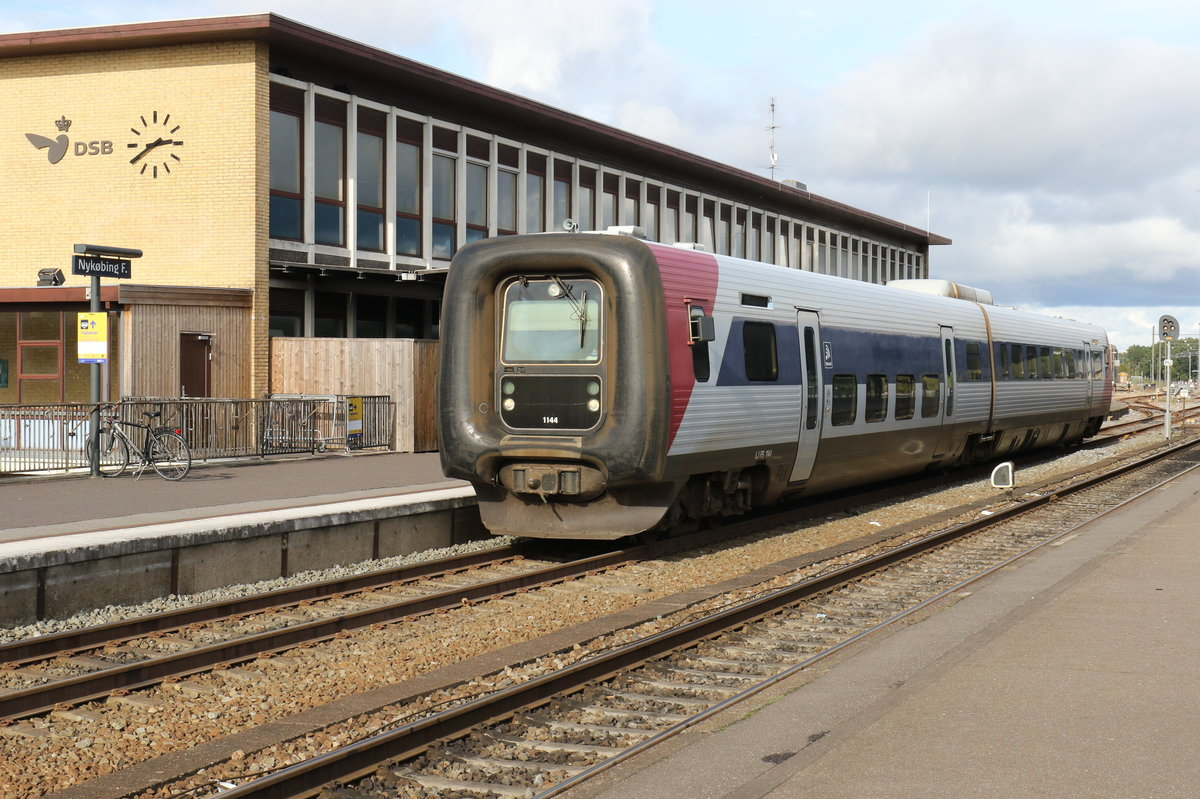
IC2 1144 at Nykøbing Falster Station, Lollandsbanen.

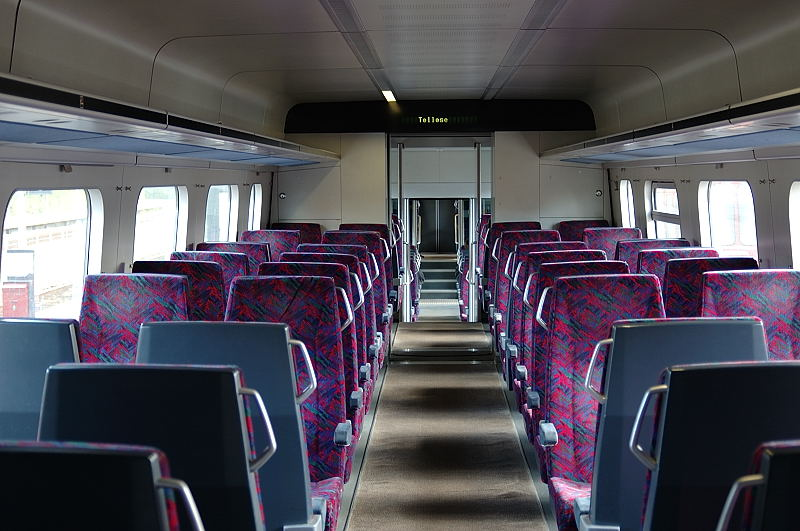
Interior of IC2 trains

=== Alstom Coradia LINT, LINT 41 trains ===
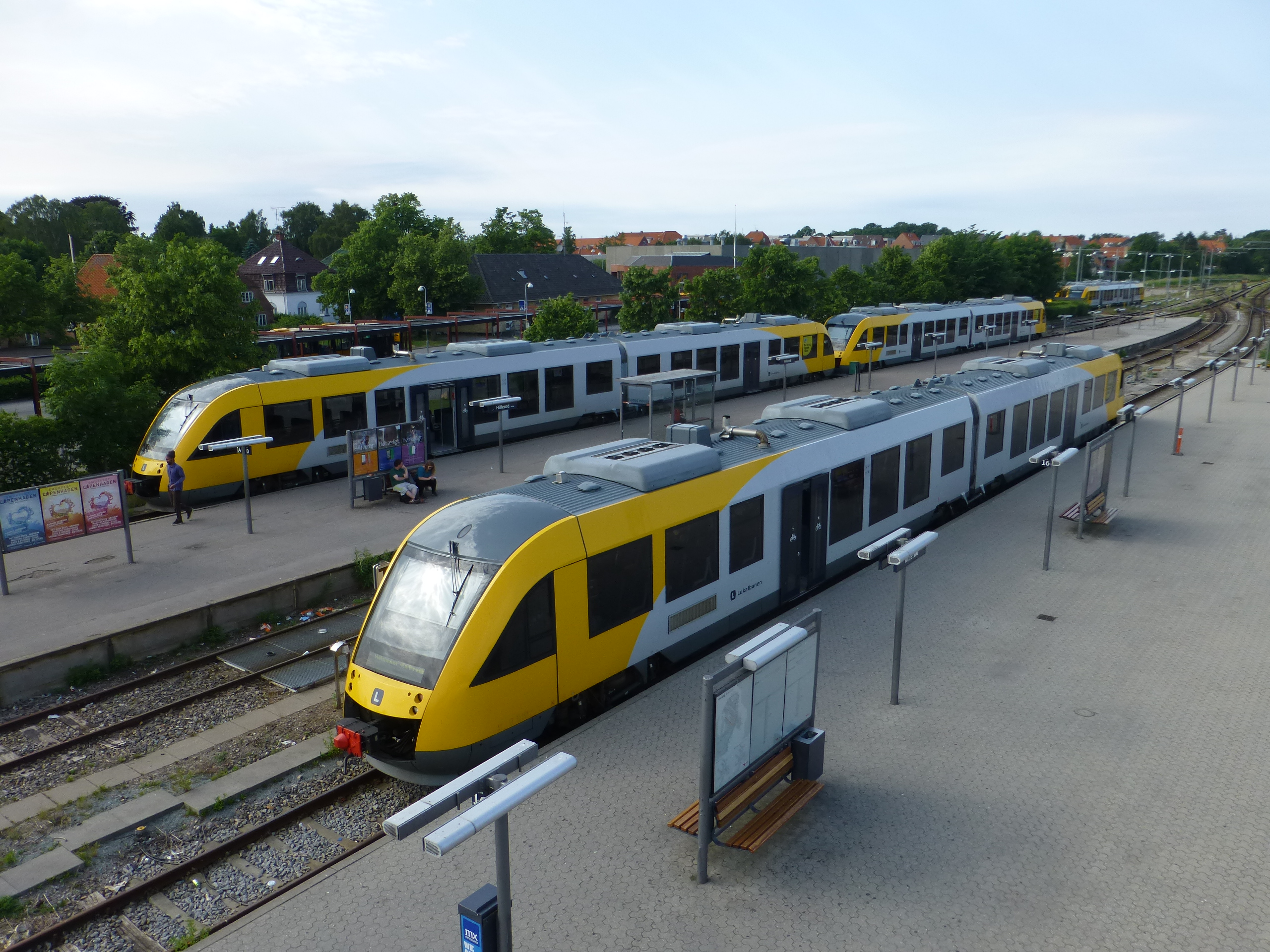
Train set of type Lint 41 in Hillerød, Hillerød Station.

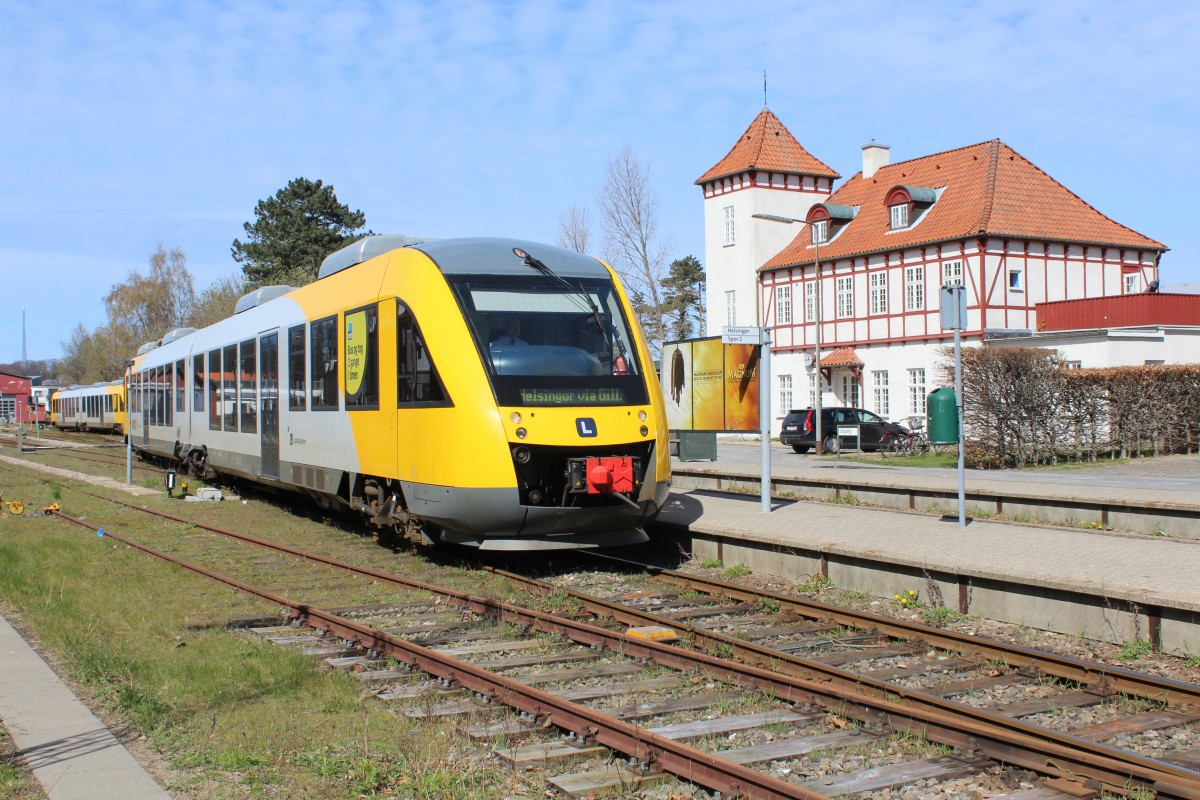
Lokalbanen, Grønnehave Station.

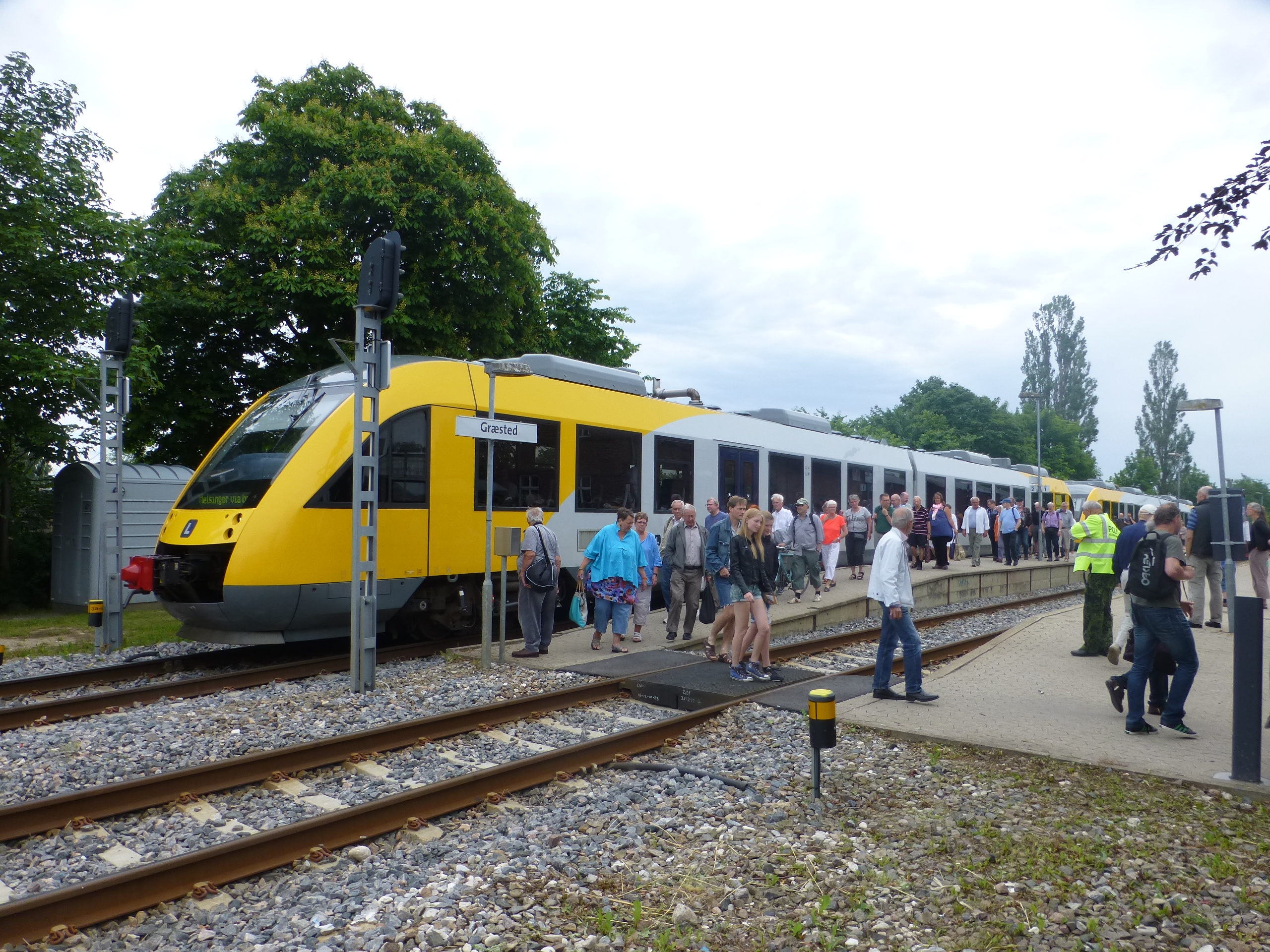
Train on the Gribskov Line calling at Græsted station.

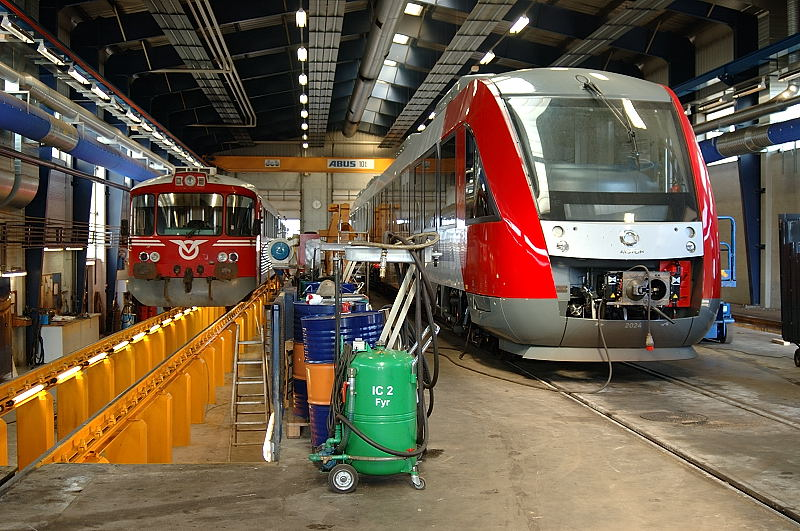
Vestsjællands Lokalbaner, VL workshop Holbæk

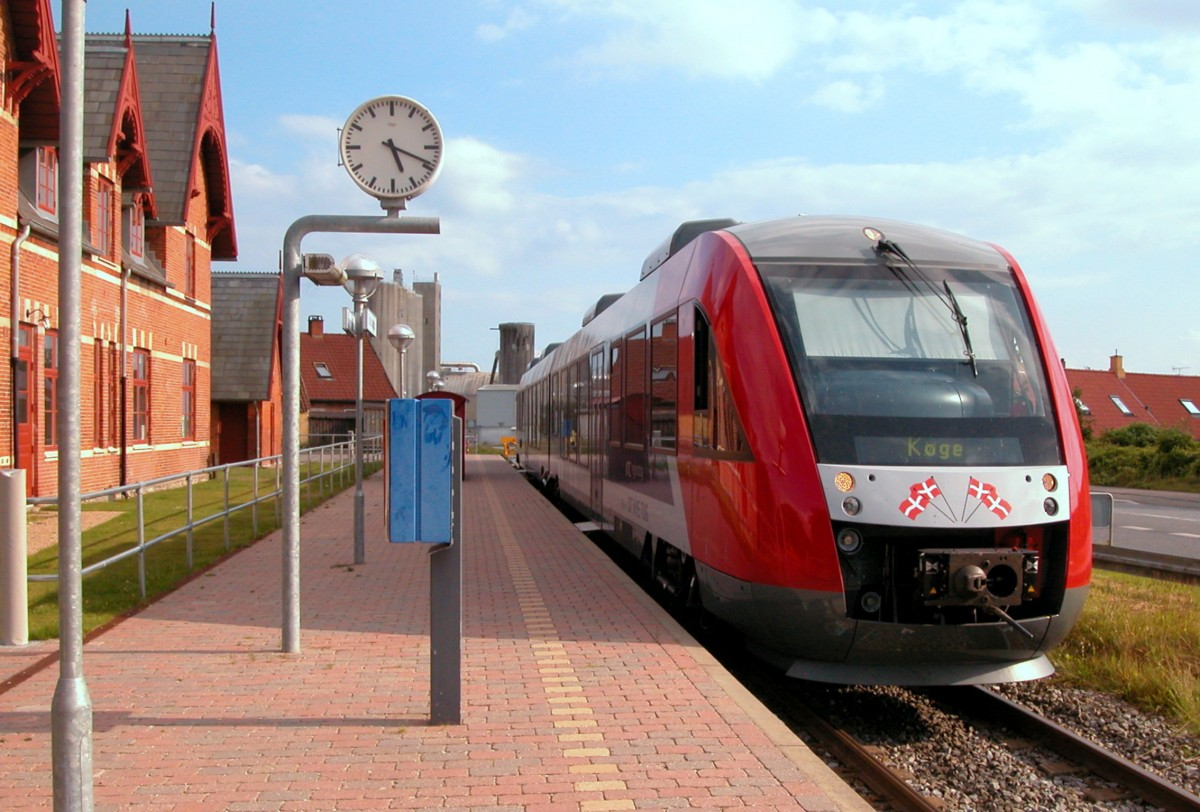
LINT 41 train at Faxe Ladeplads Station.

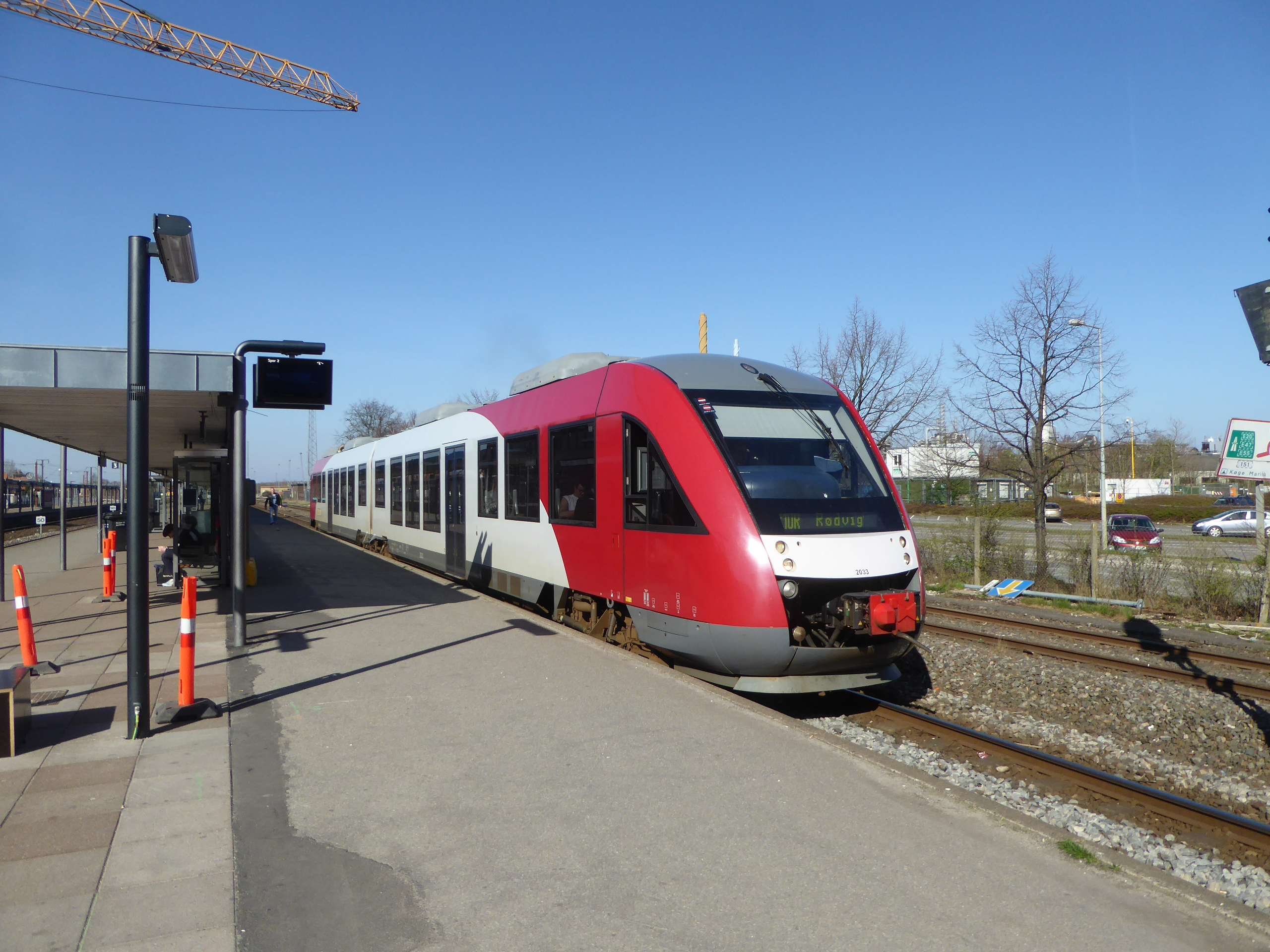
Lint41 Køge Station

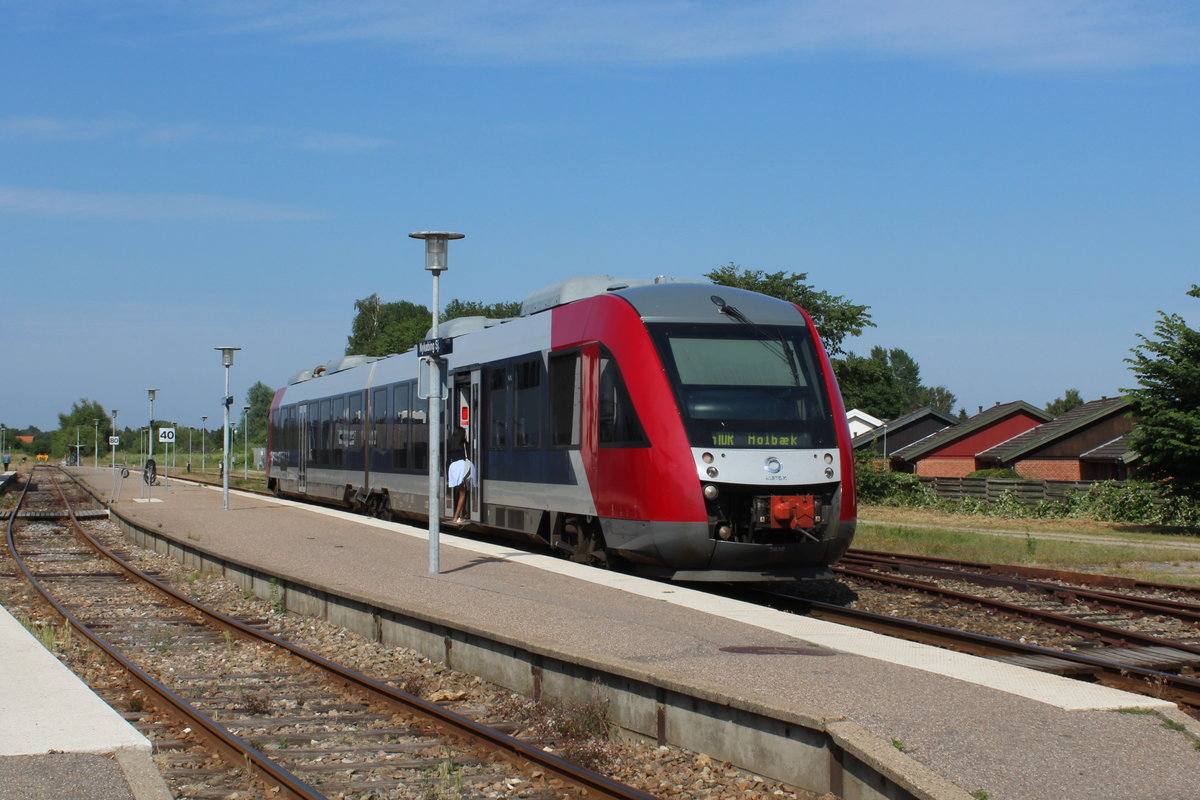
Lindt 41 at Odsherredsbanen

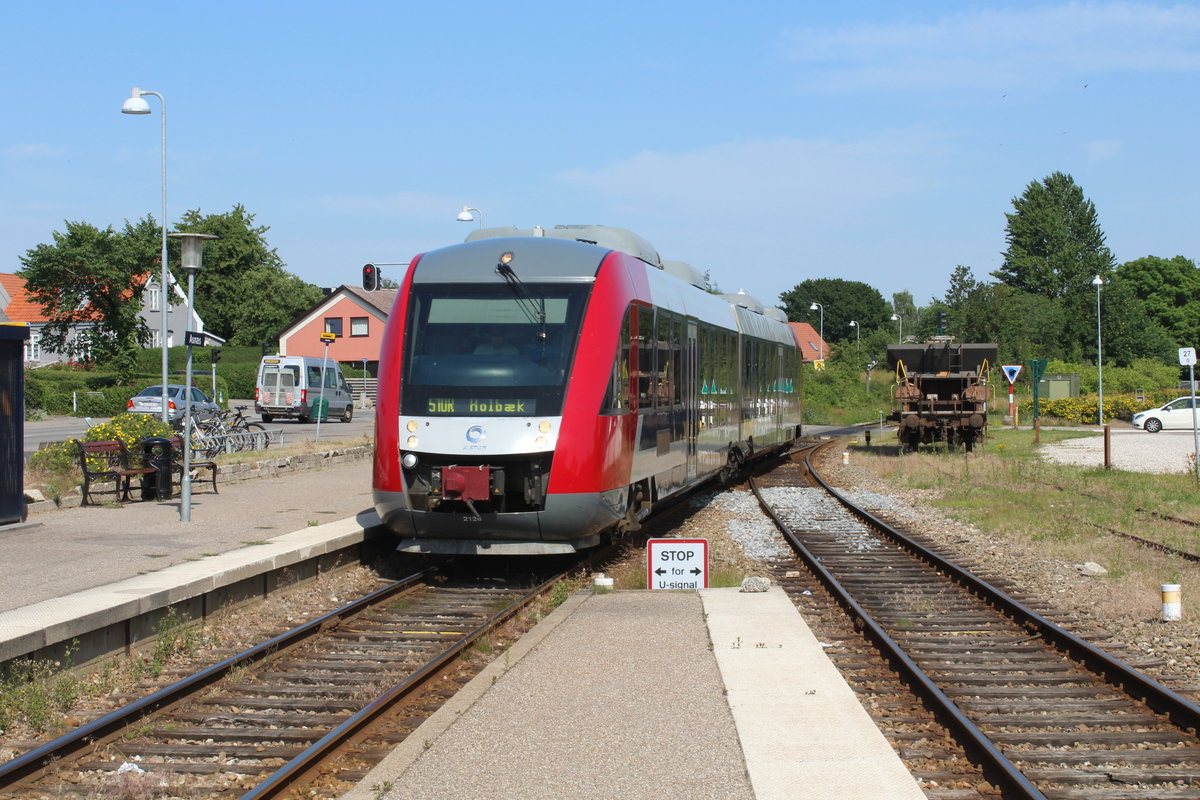
Lindt 41 at Nykøbing Sj. Station, Odsherredsbanen

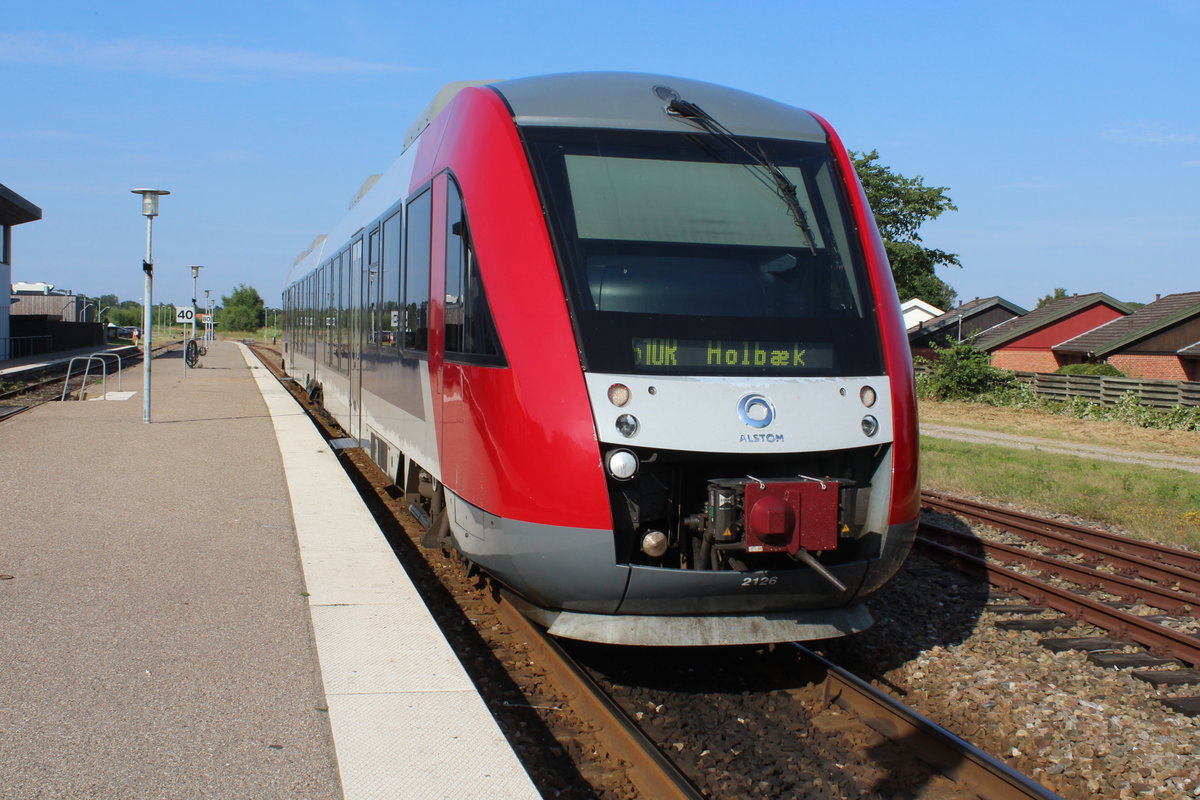
Lint 41, Odsherredsbanen

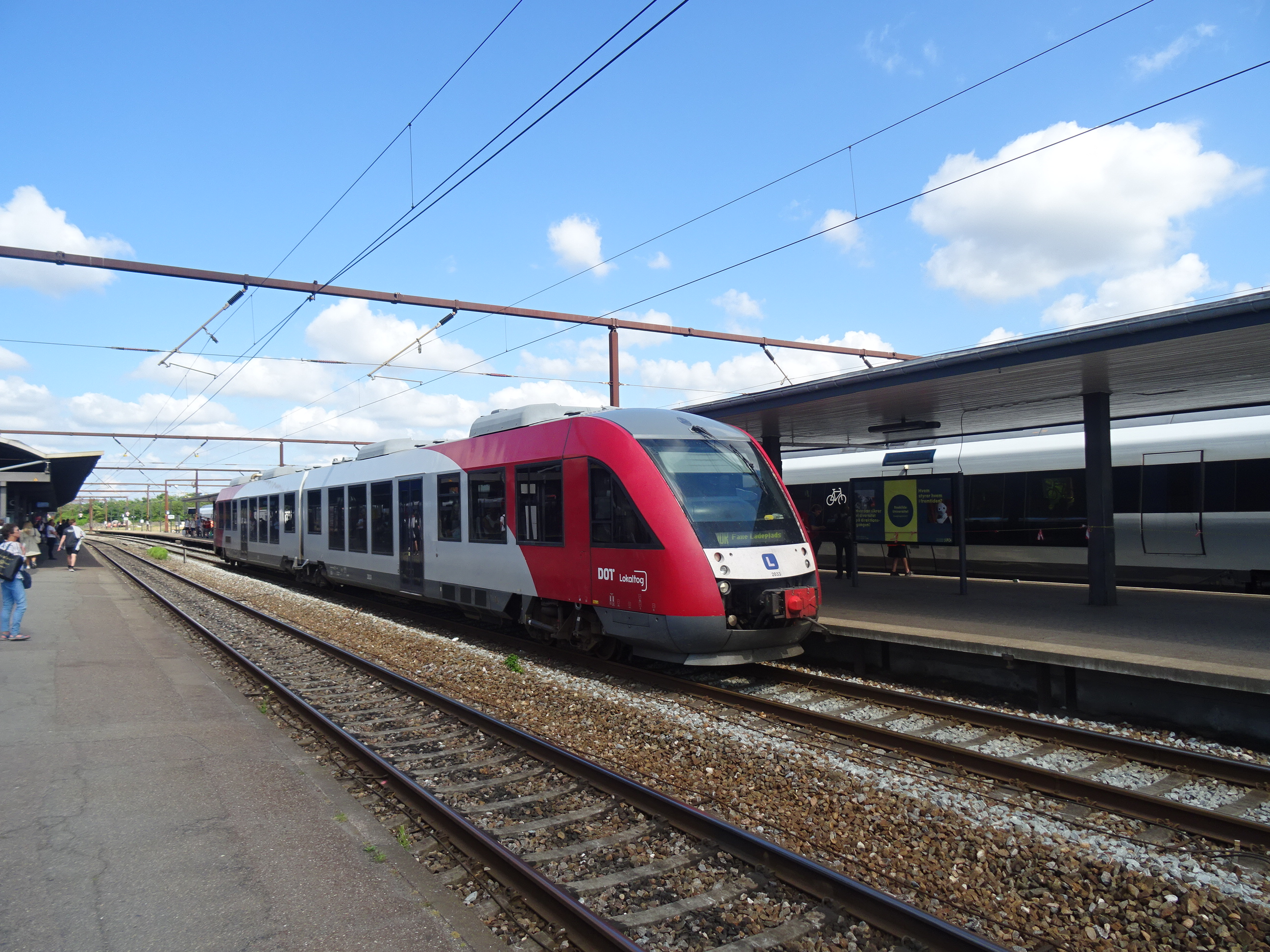
Lint41 at Roskilde Station.

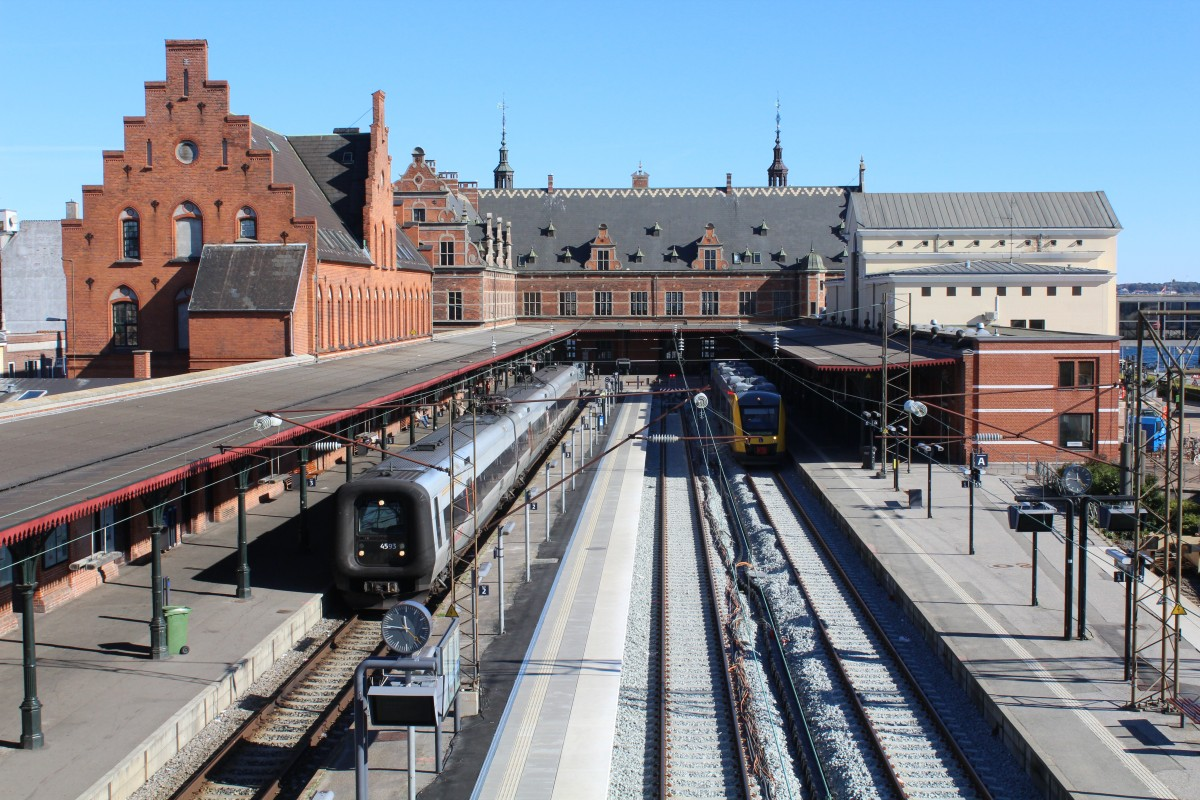
Helsingør Station

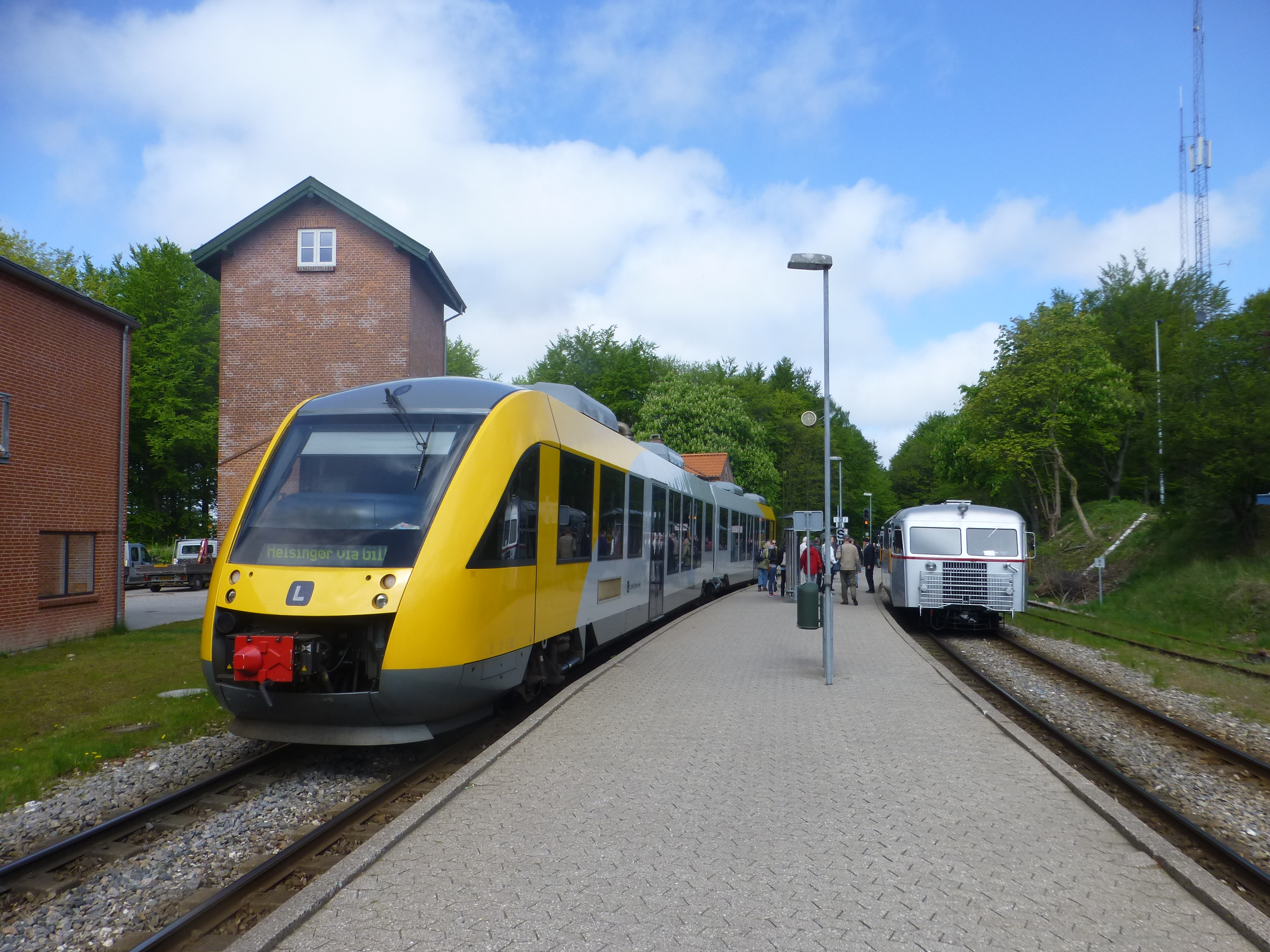
A regular train and the diesel railcar LNJ SM 13 at Kagerup Station on Gribskovbanen

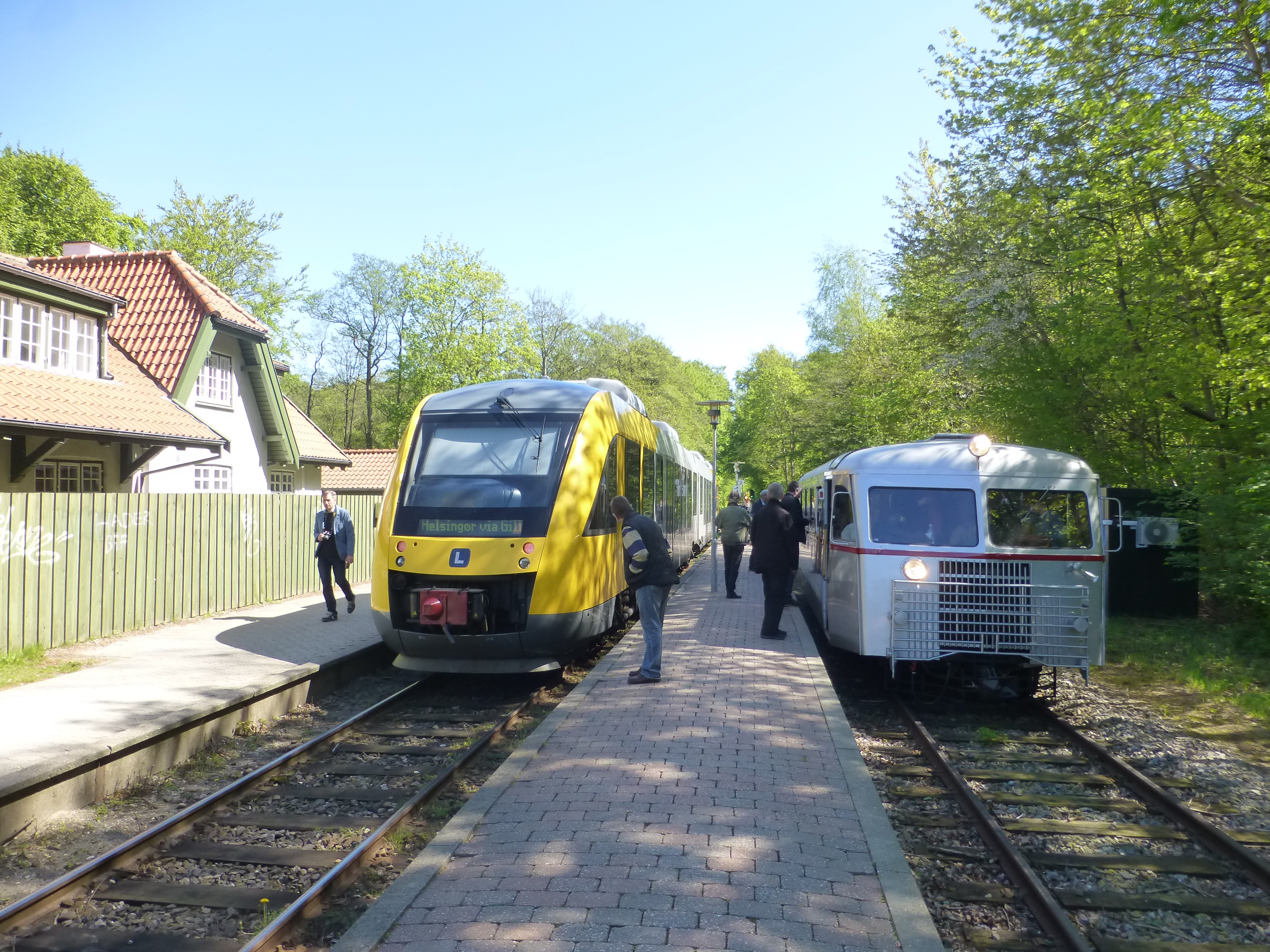
A regular train and the diesel railcar LNJ SM 13 at Hellebæk Station on Hornbækbanen

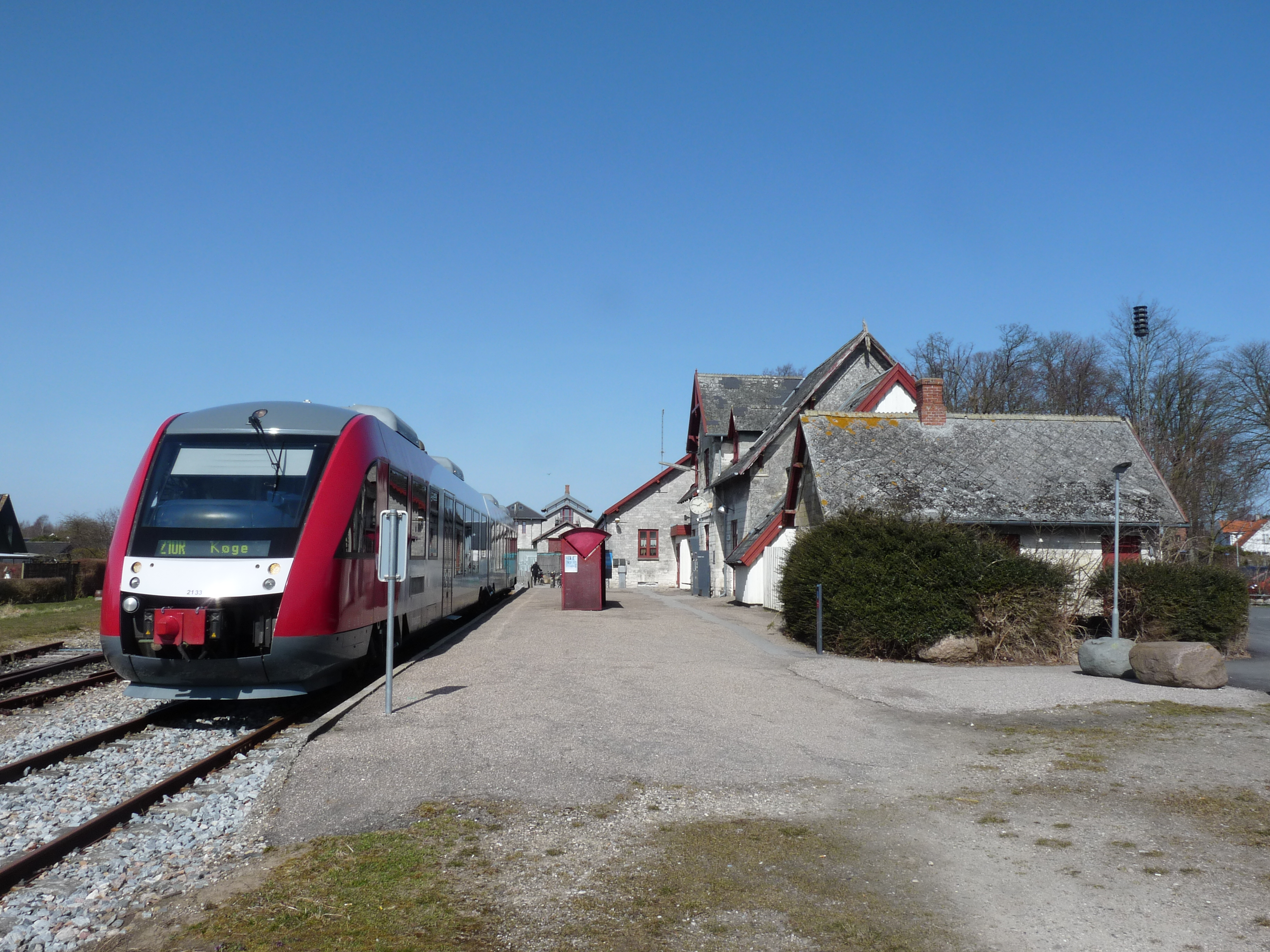
Lint 41, Rødvig station

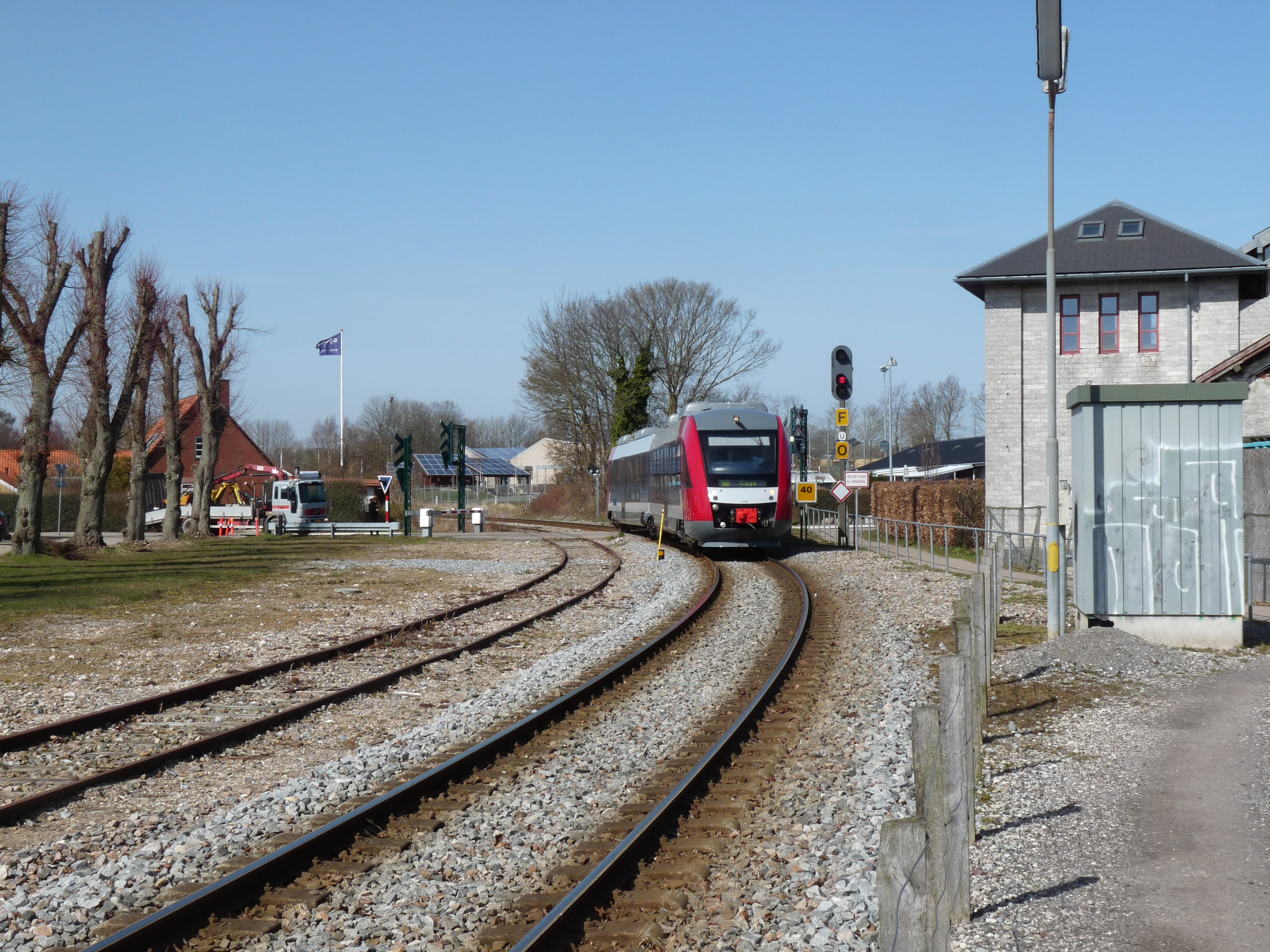
Rødvig station

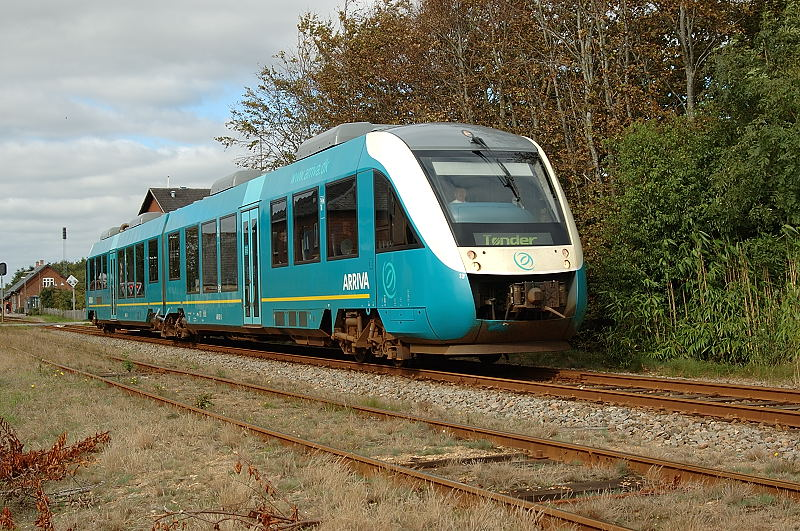
Arriva Danmark, Lint Arriva

=== Alstom Coradia LINT, LINT LM trains ===
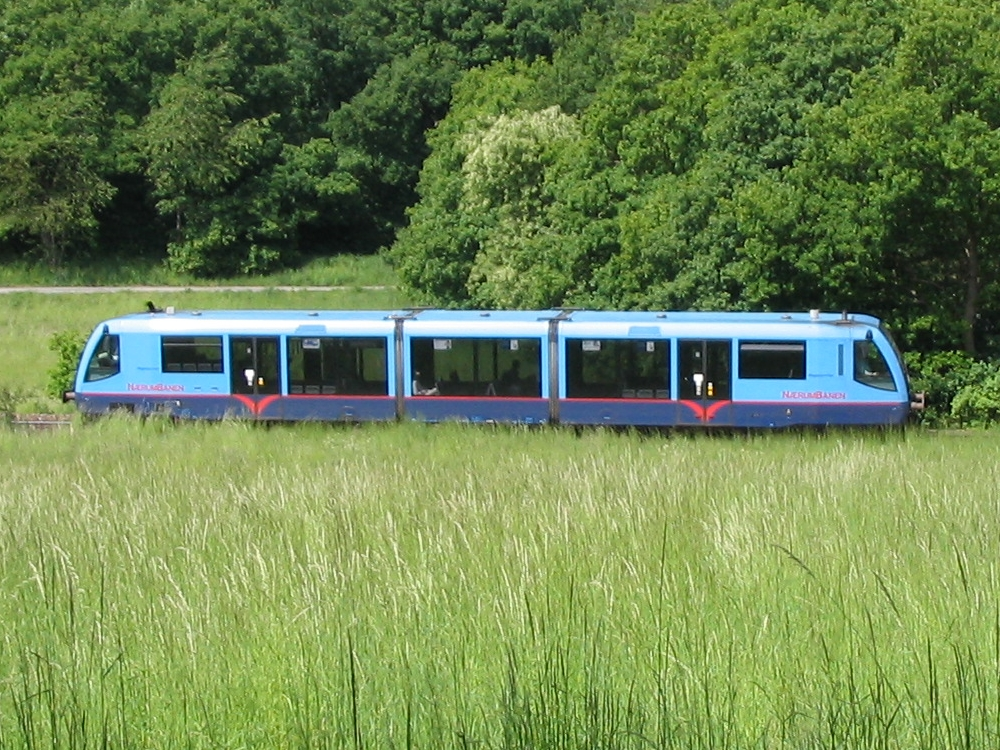
Regiosprinter south of nærum

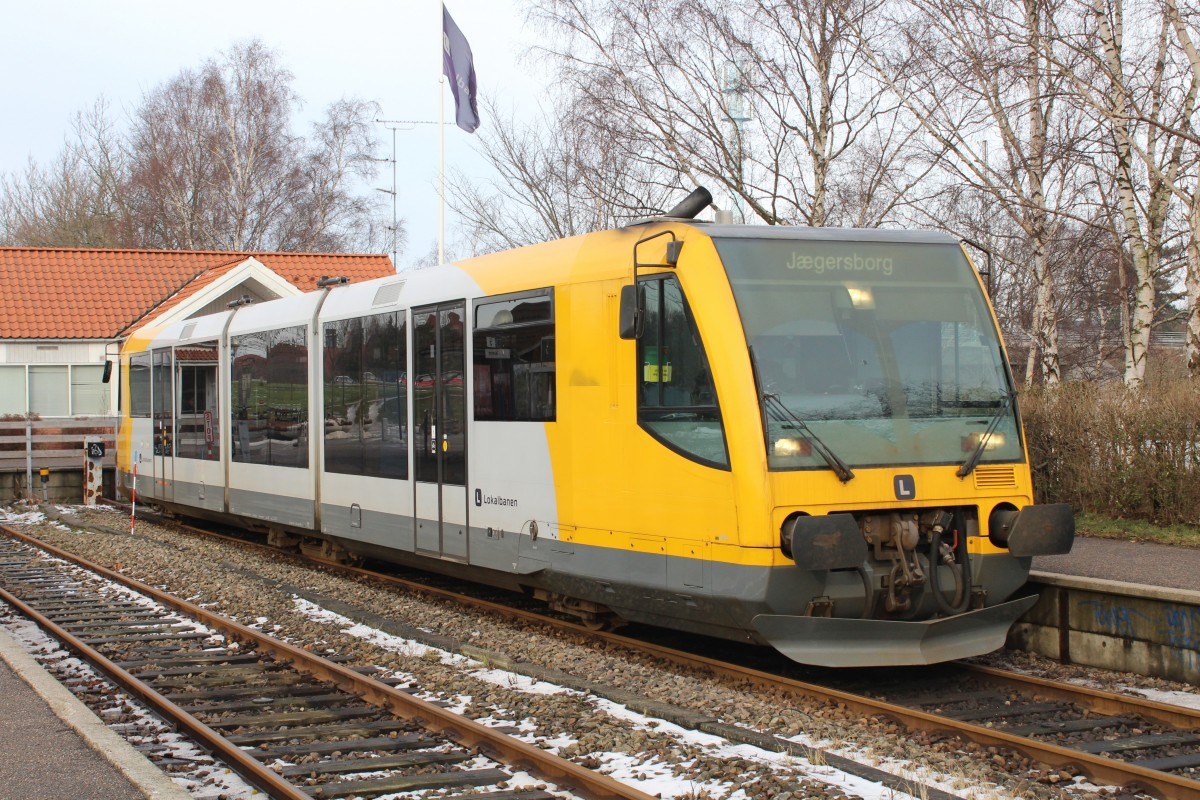
Lokalbanen, Regiosprinter Nærumbanen

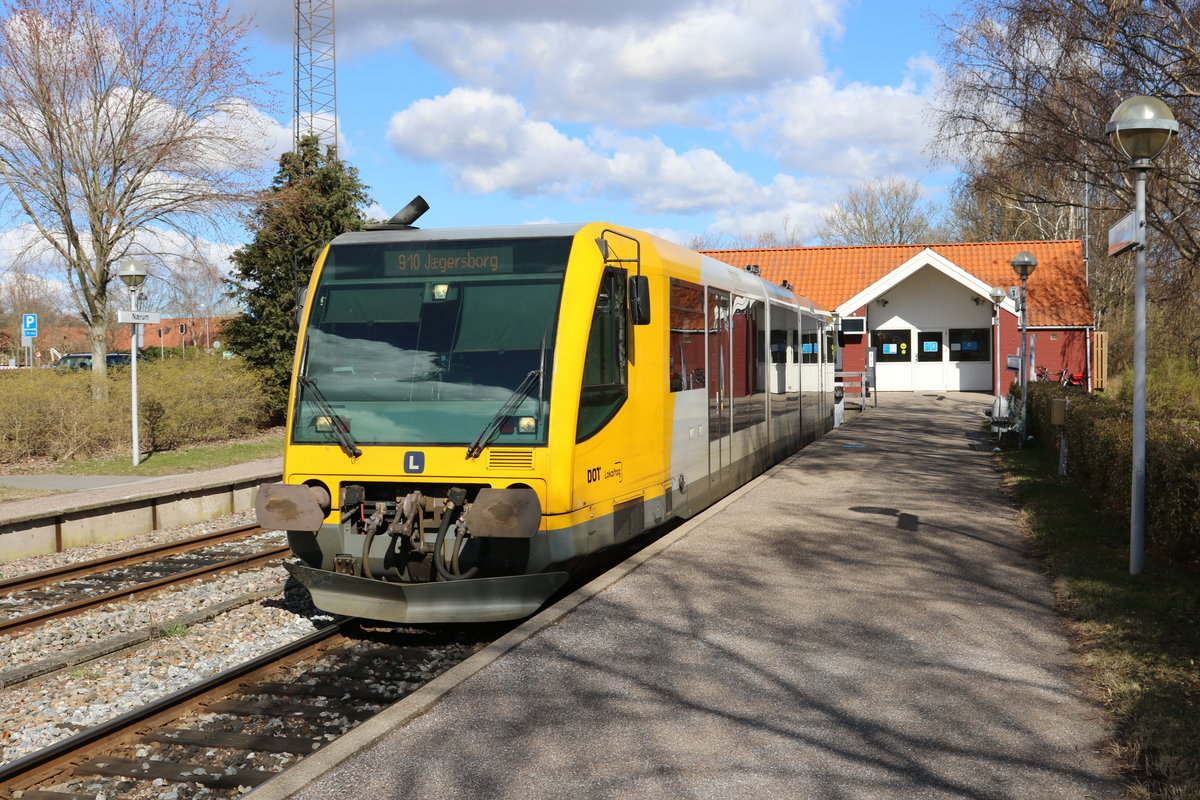
Lm 23, number 230 at Jægersborg Station

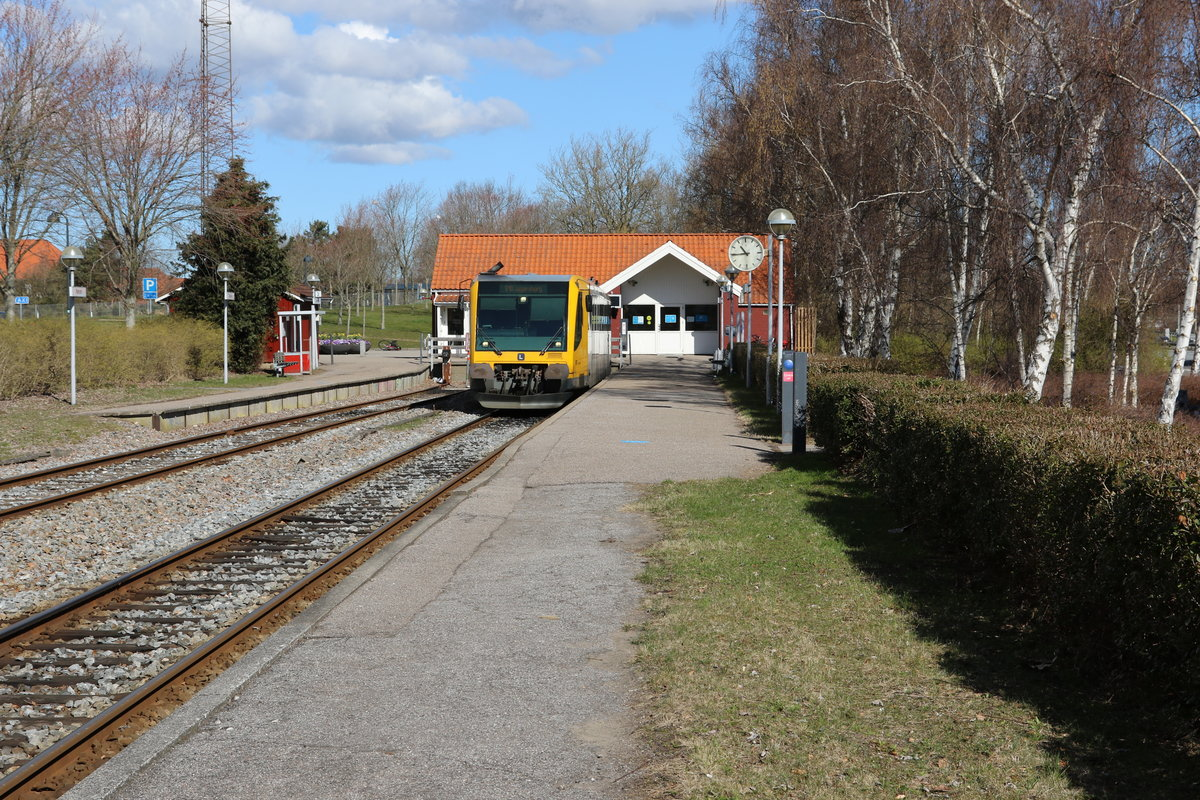
Lm 23 at Jægersborg Station.

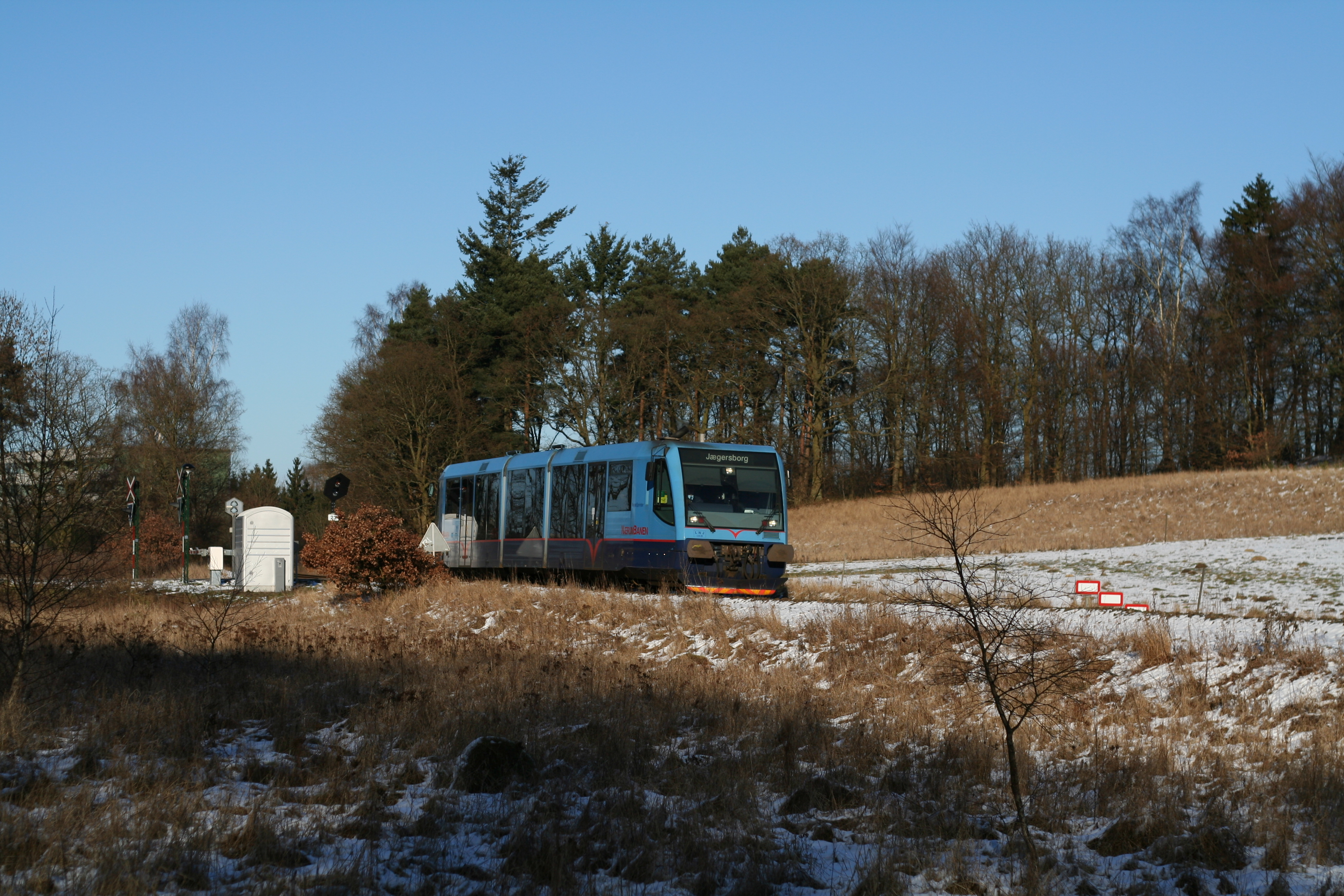
Nærumbanen, Regiosprinter, Lm 23 near Nærum

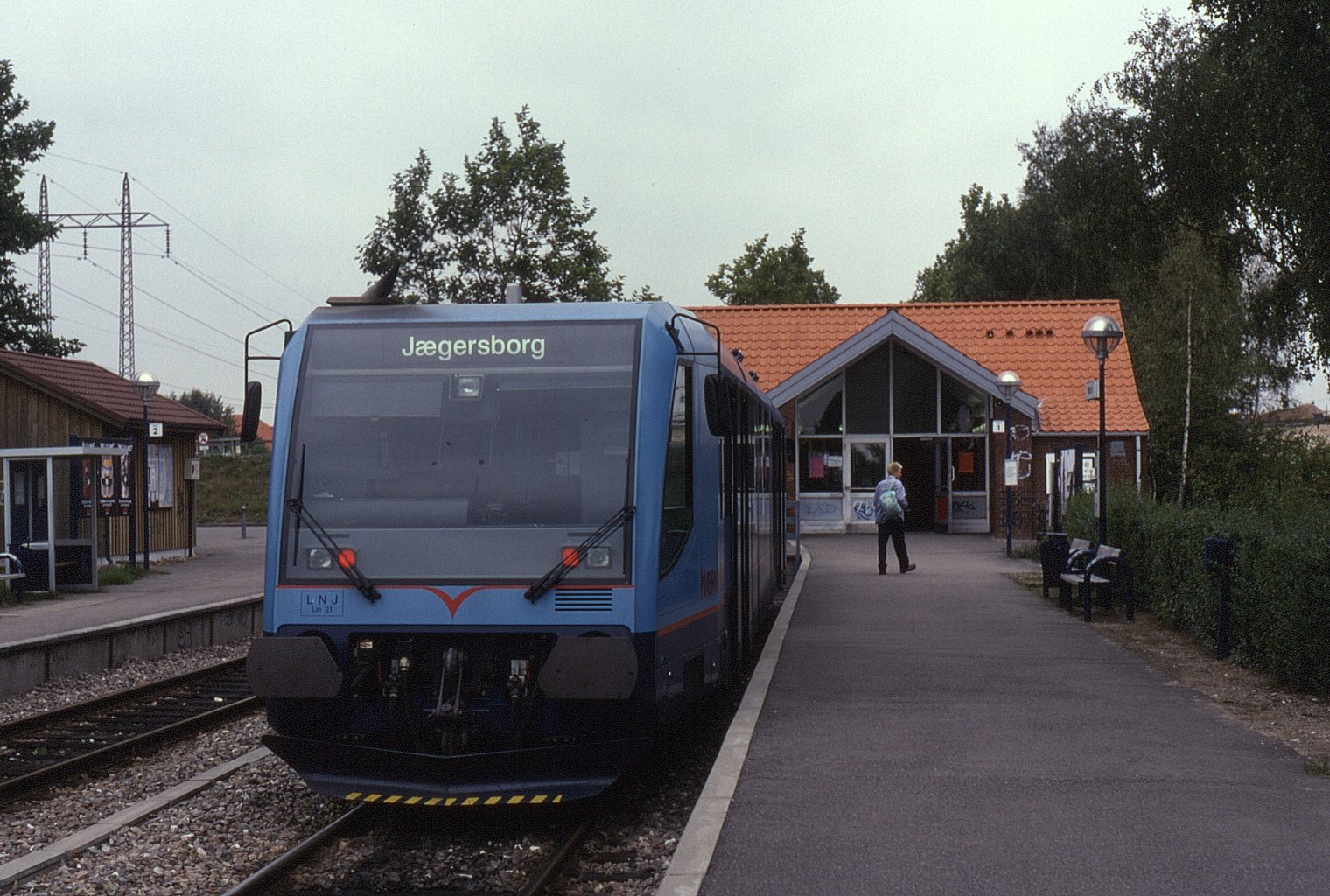
Nærum LNJ "RegioSprinter" Lm21

=== Siemens Desiro trains ===
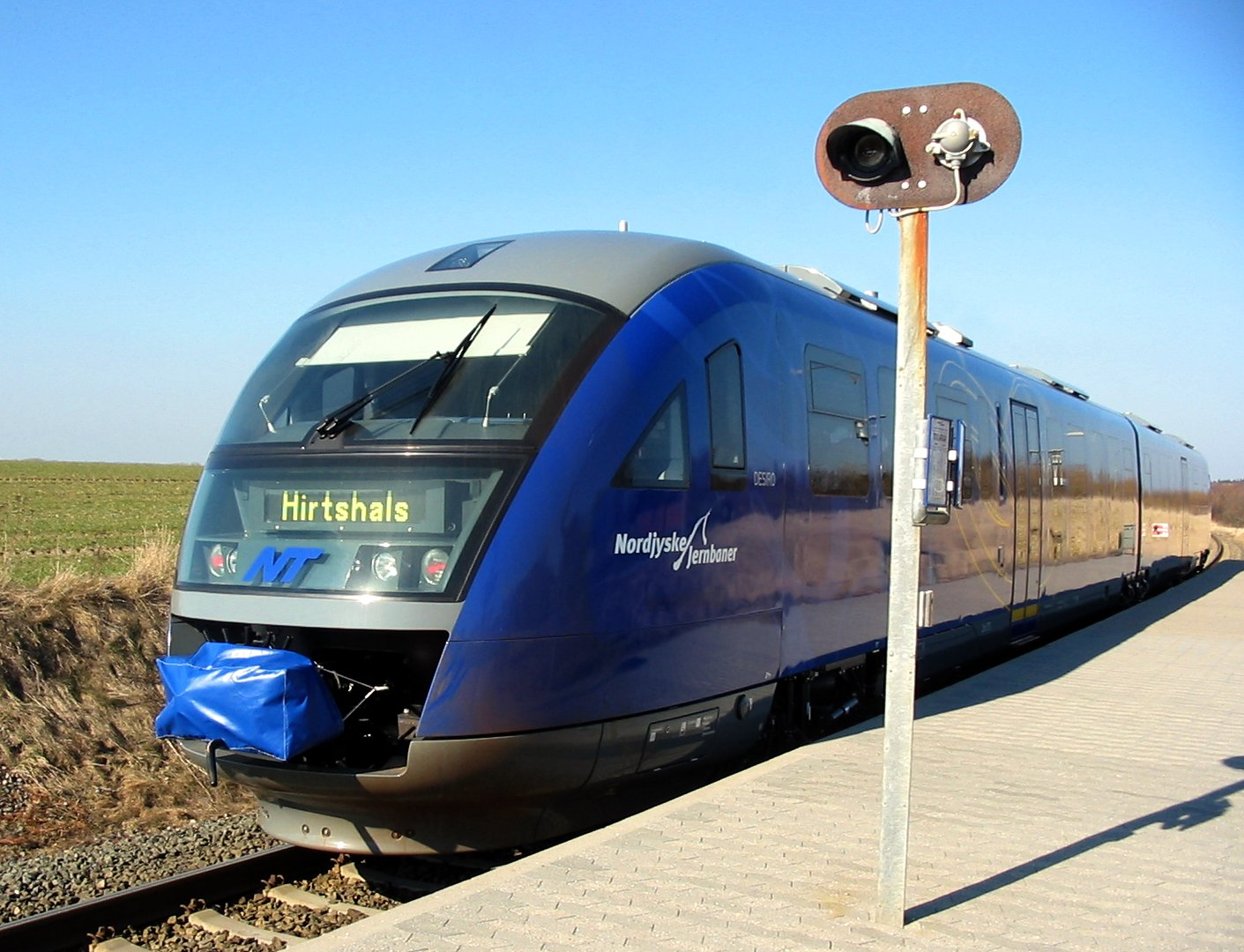
Siemens Desiro trains this one from Nordjyske Jernbaner, but the same type is also in use on Little South Line.

=== Y-trains (YM) ===
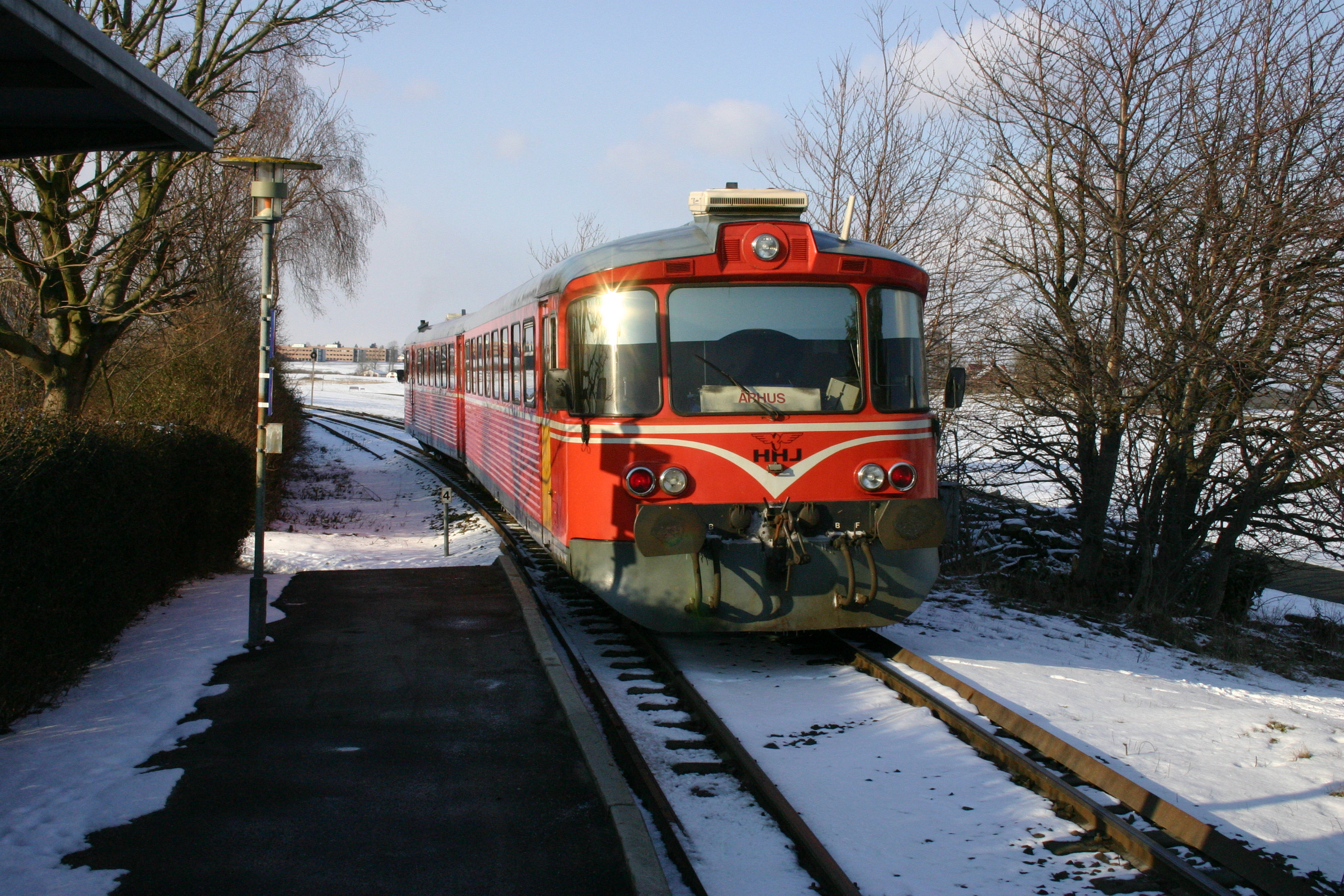
One of Odderbanen's Y trains^{da}

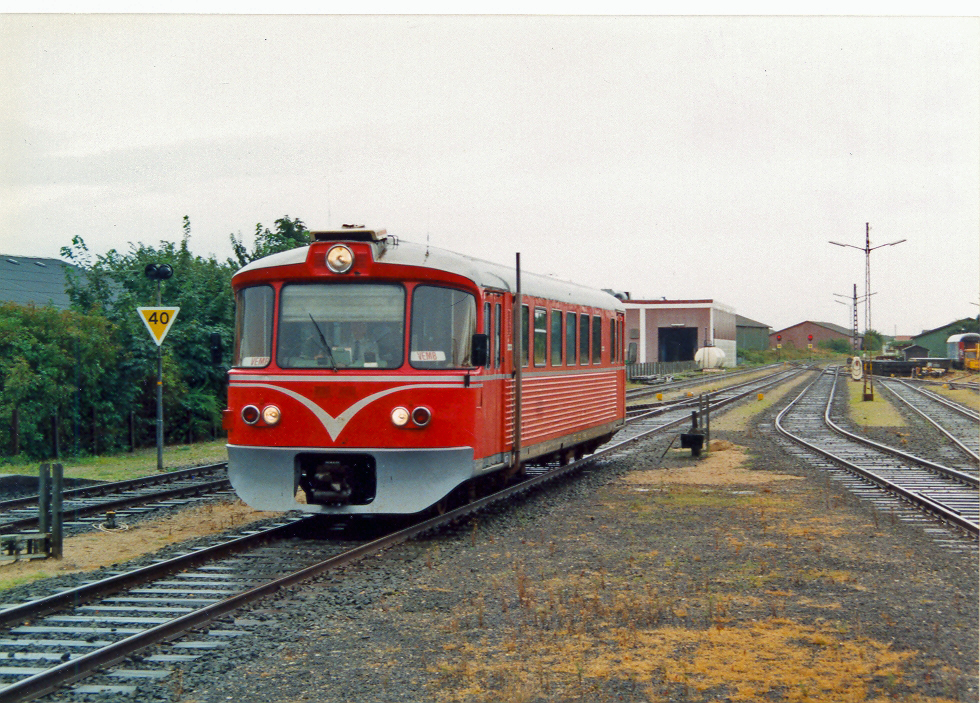
Lemvigbanen's solo motorcar Ym 15, taken over from Nærumbanen.

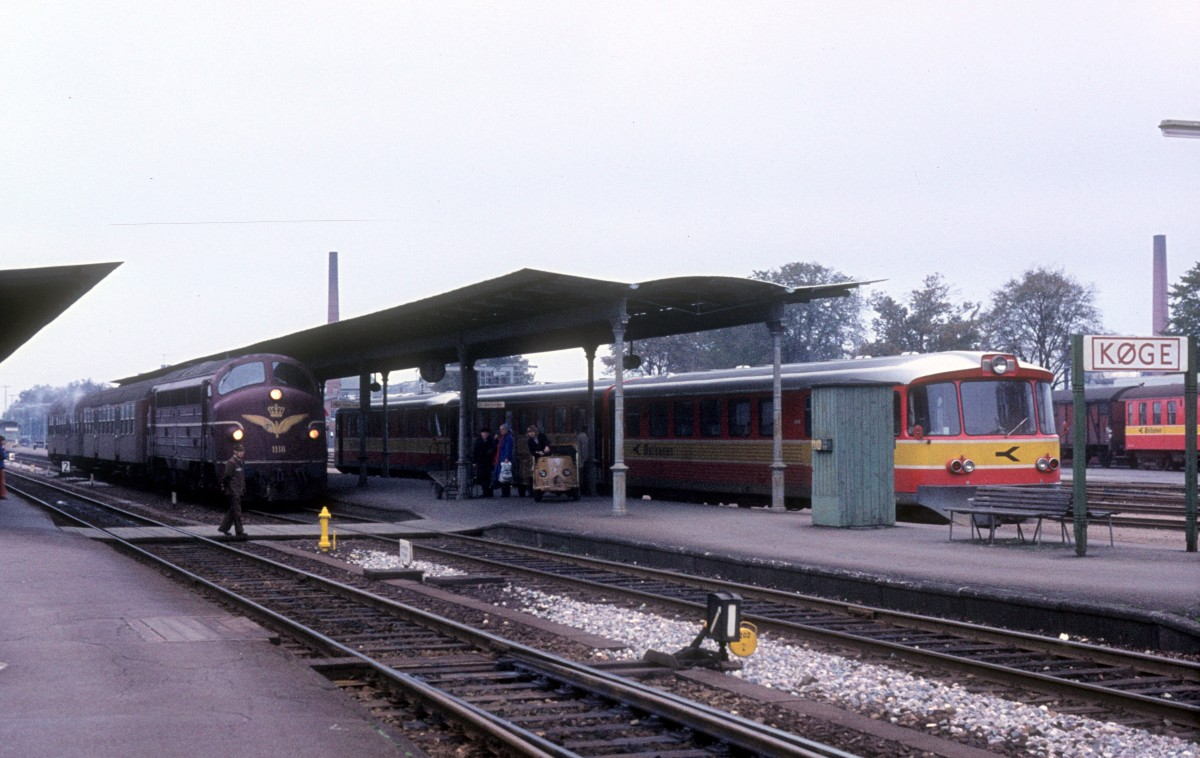
Ym train at Køge Station, Østbanen.

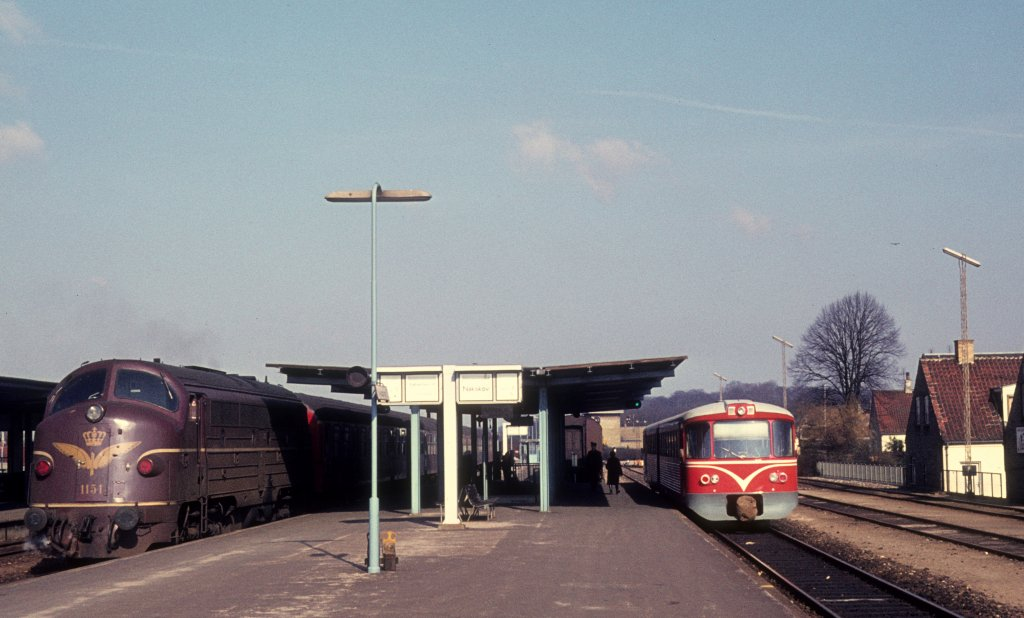
Ym train at Nykøbing Falster Station, Lollandsbanen.

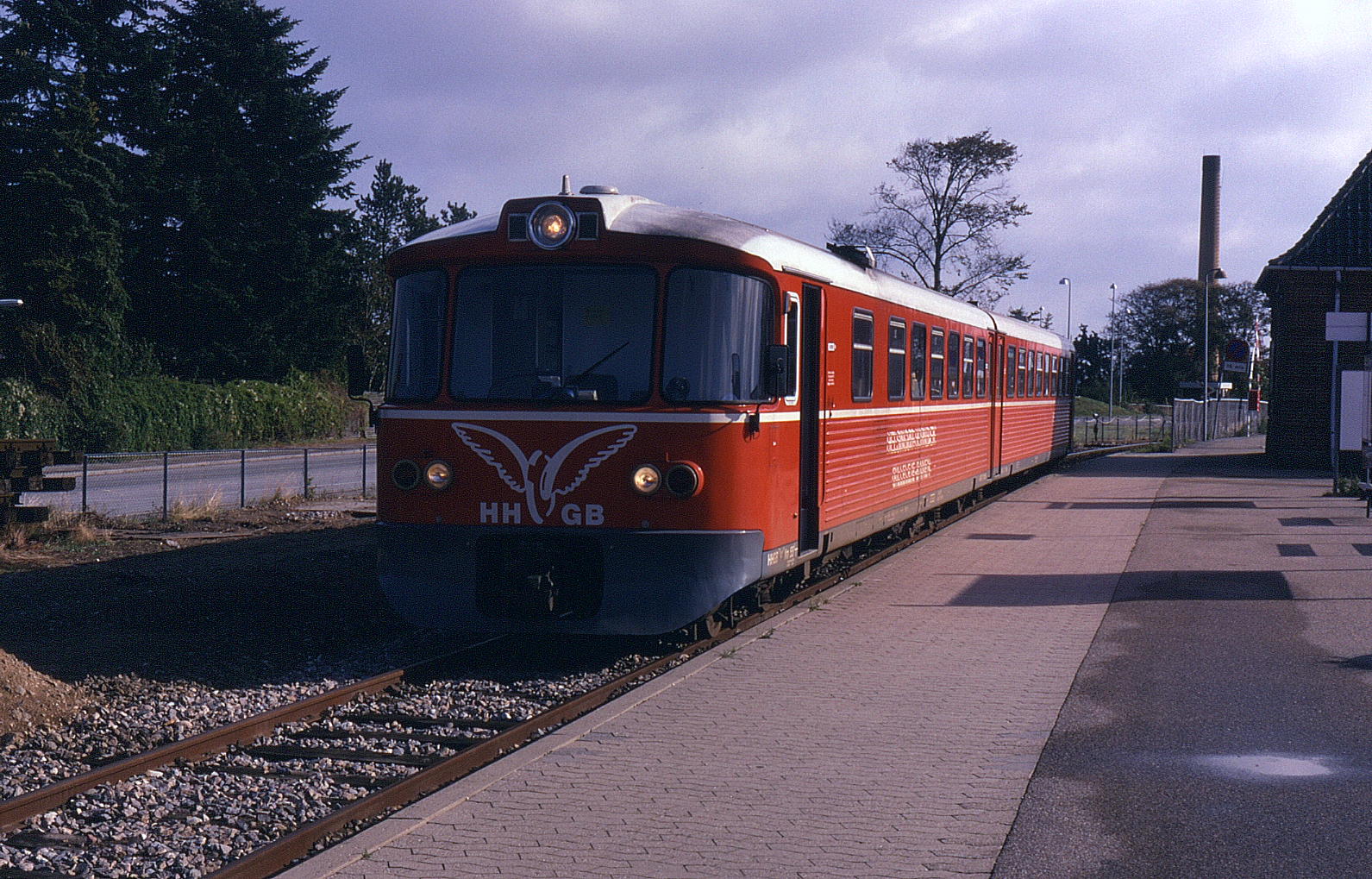
Gillelje HHGB Ym55

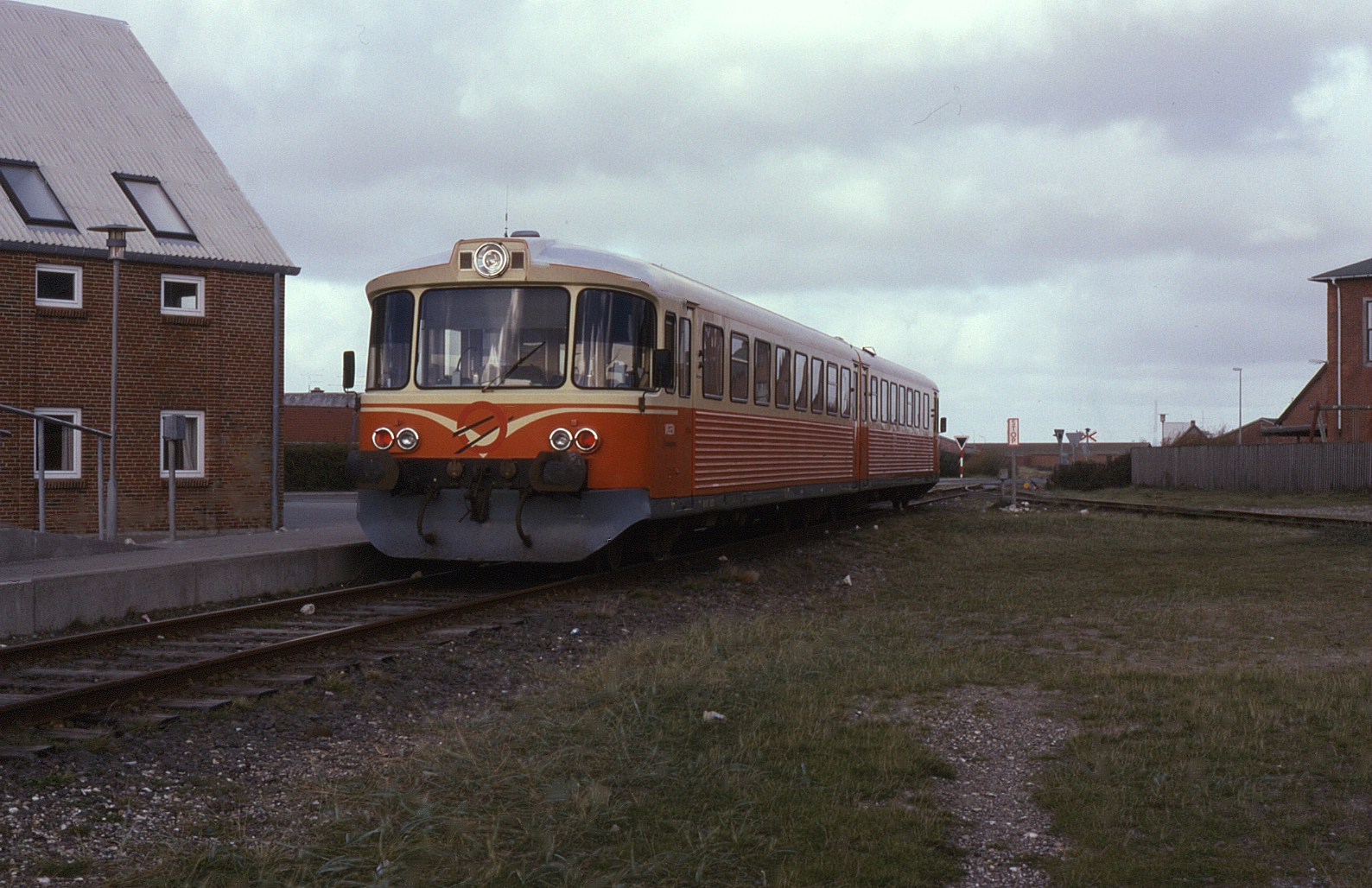
Ym train, Ym 13

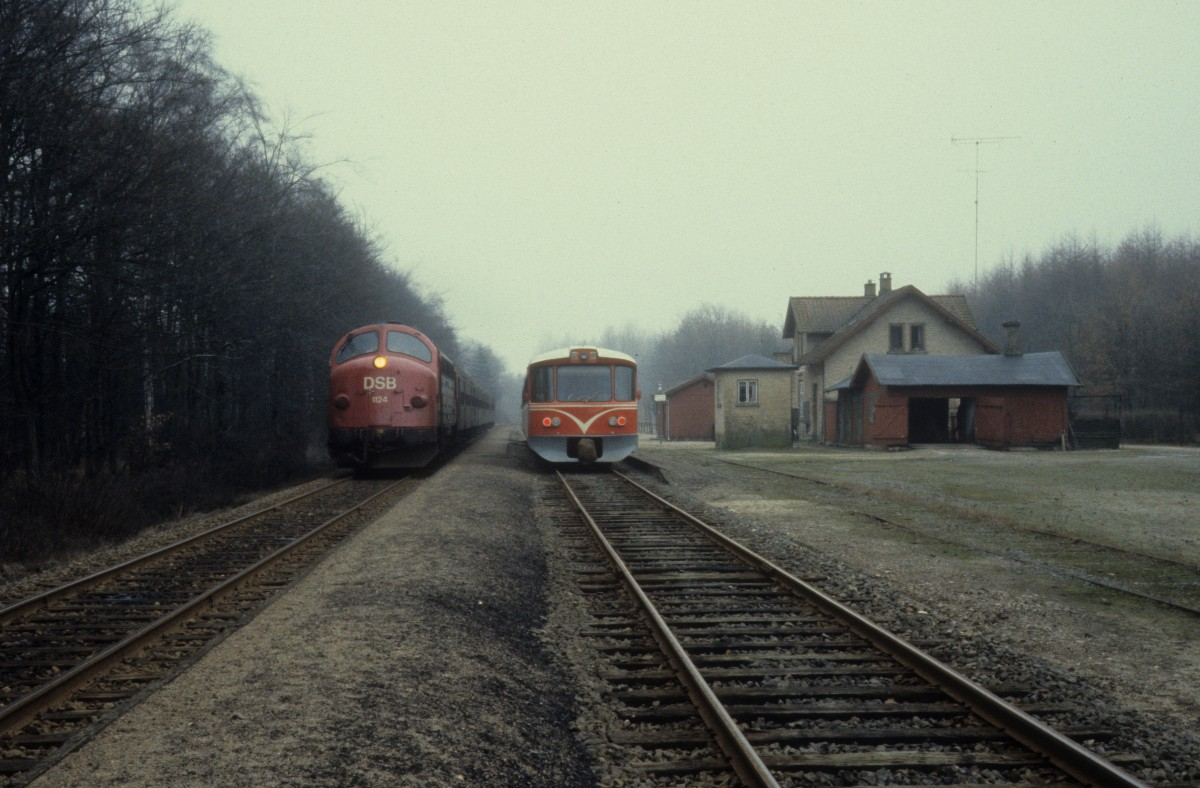
Ym train

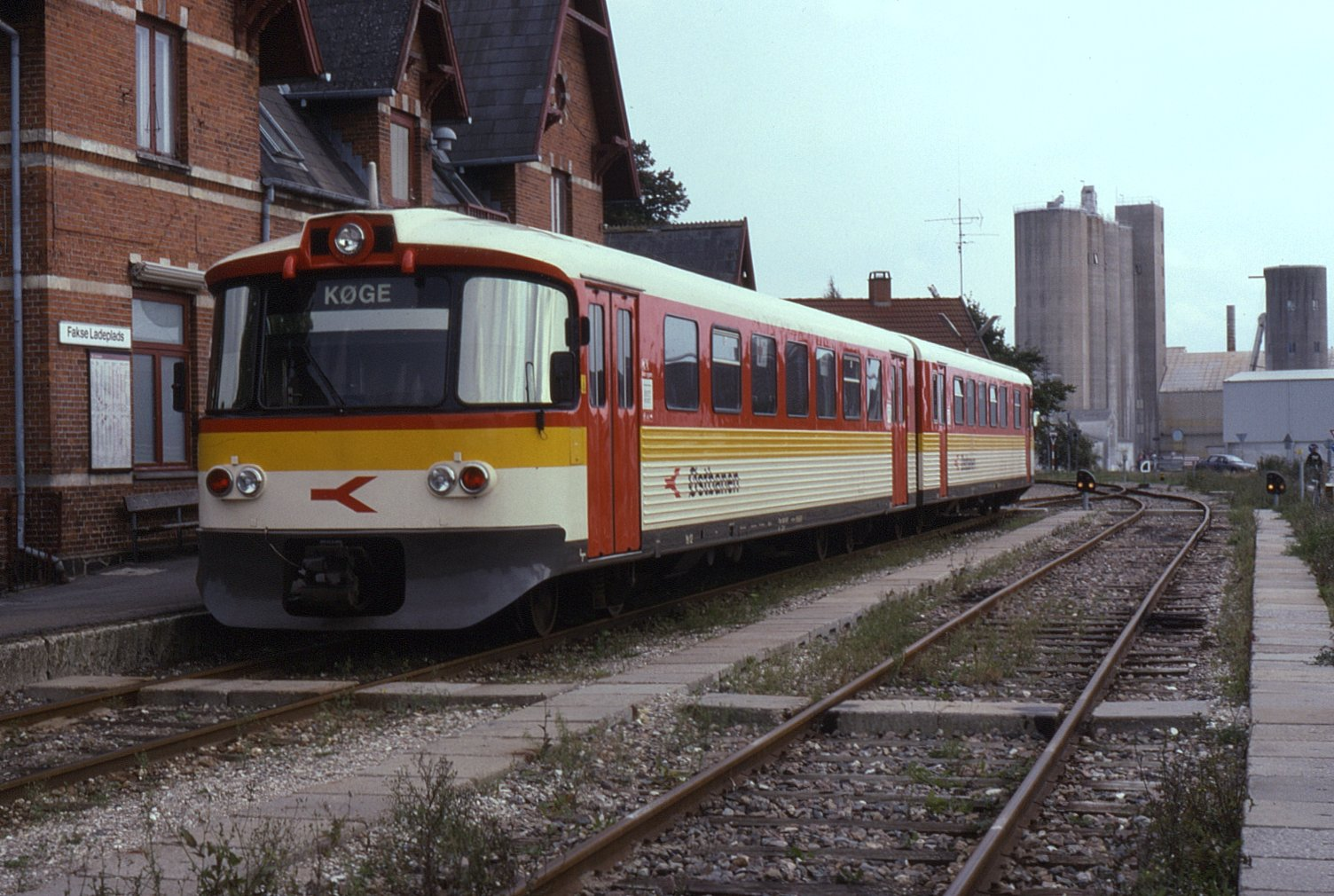
Faske Ladeplads ØSJS Ym2

=== MY trains ===
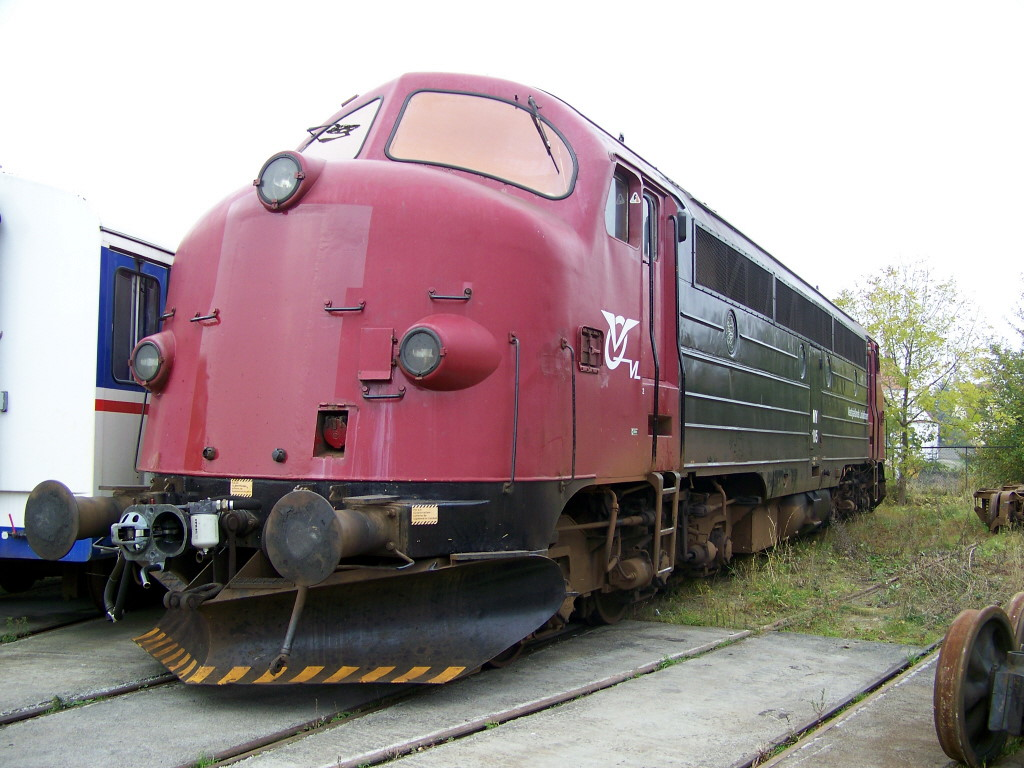
One of the railway's locomotives, an MY locomotive, VL MY 105 (former DSB MY 1145) in Holbæk

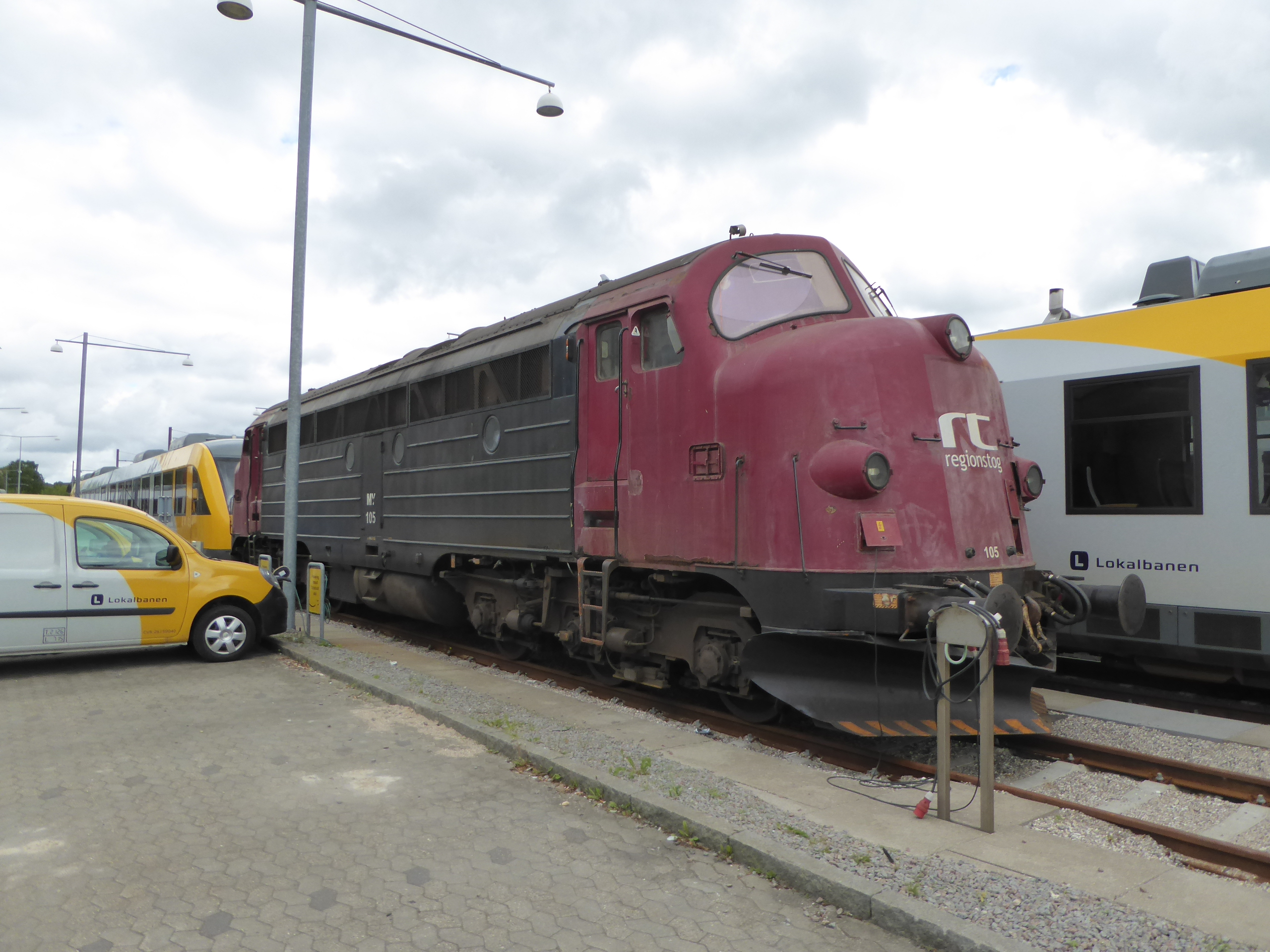
MY 105 at Hillerød Station.

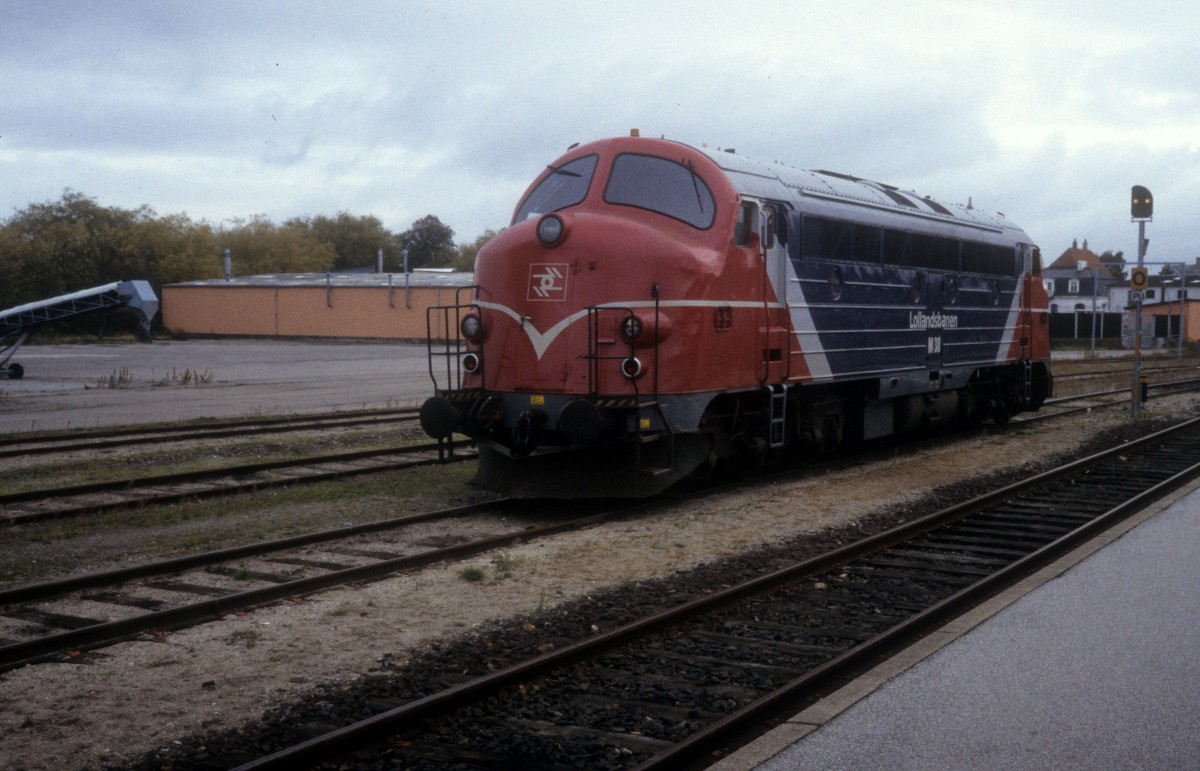
Lollandsbanen M 38, (former/ ex DSB MY 778726)

=== MX trains ===
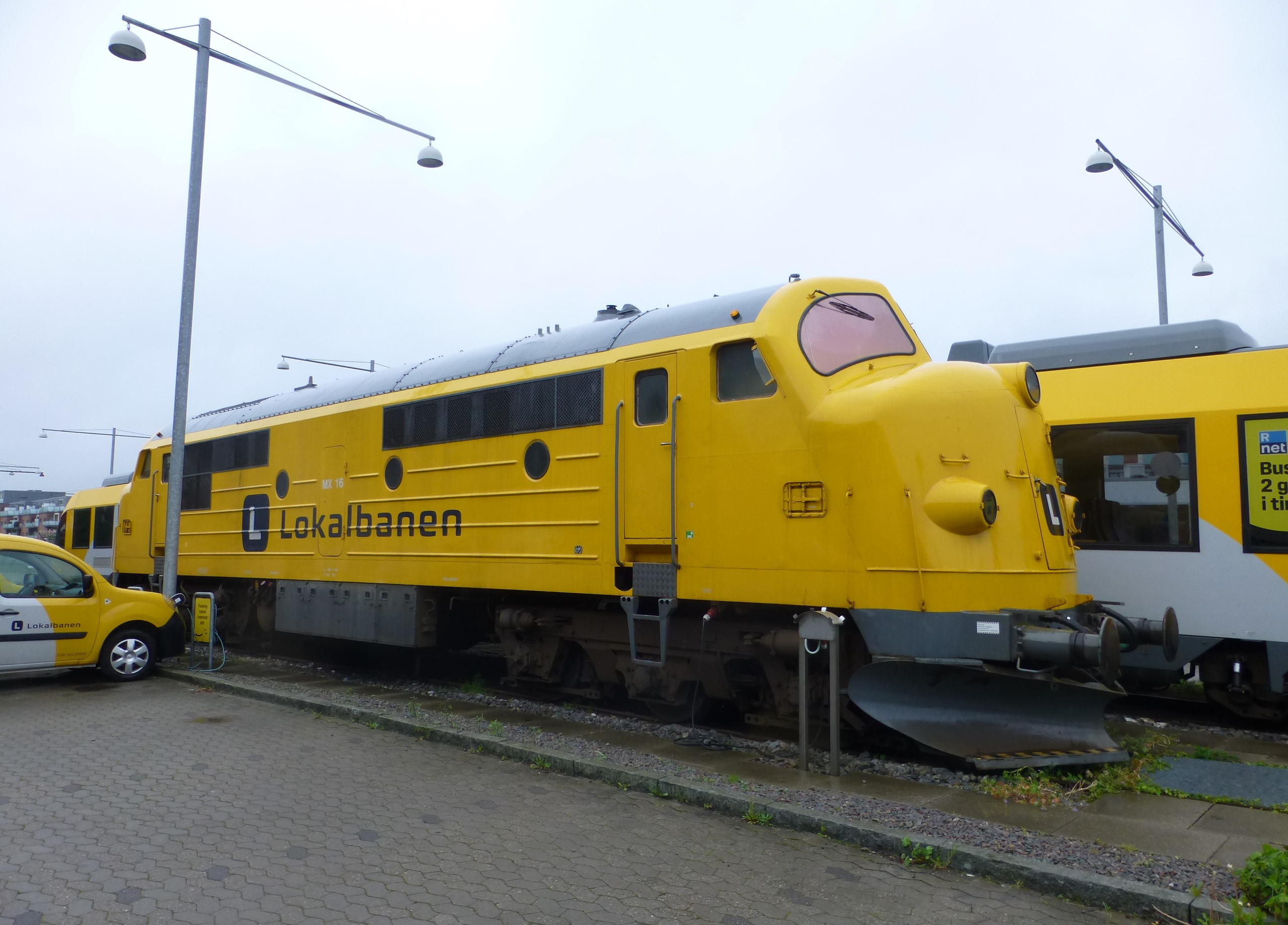
MX 16 at Hillerød Station.

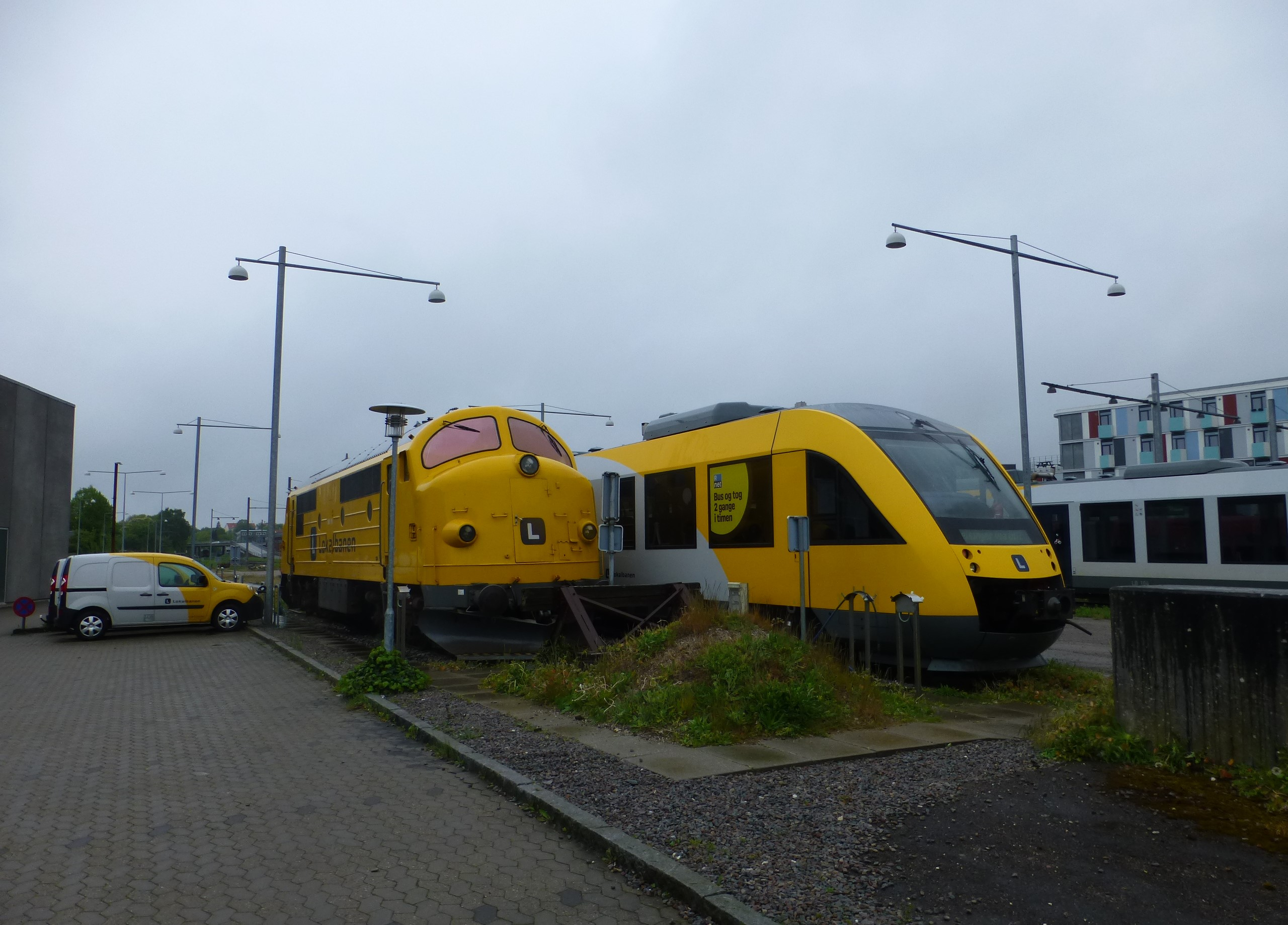
MX 16 and Lint41 at Hillerød Station

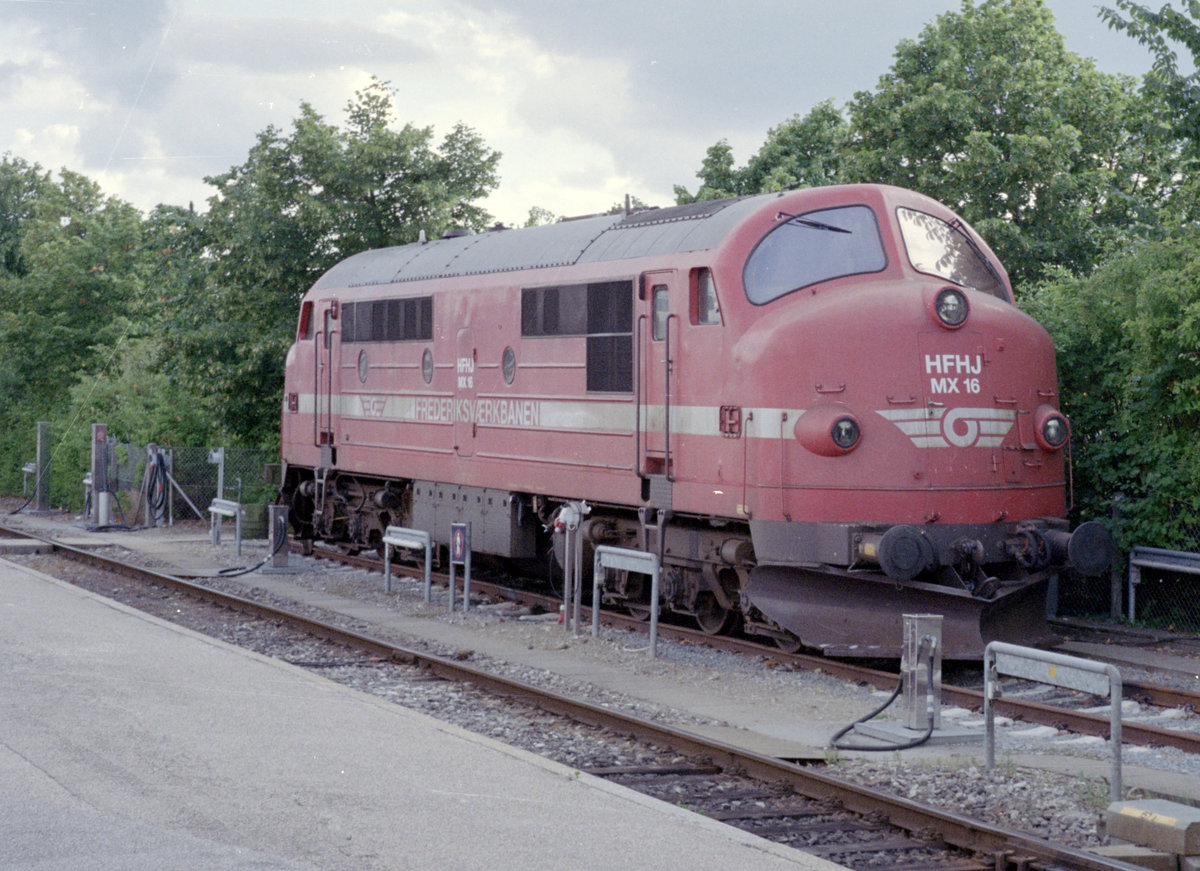
MX 16 on Frederiksværkbanen

=== Service trains ===
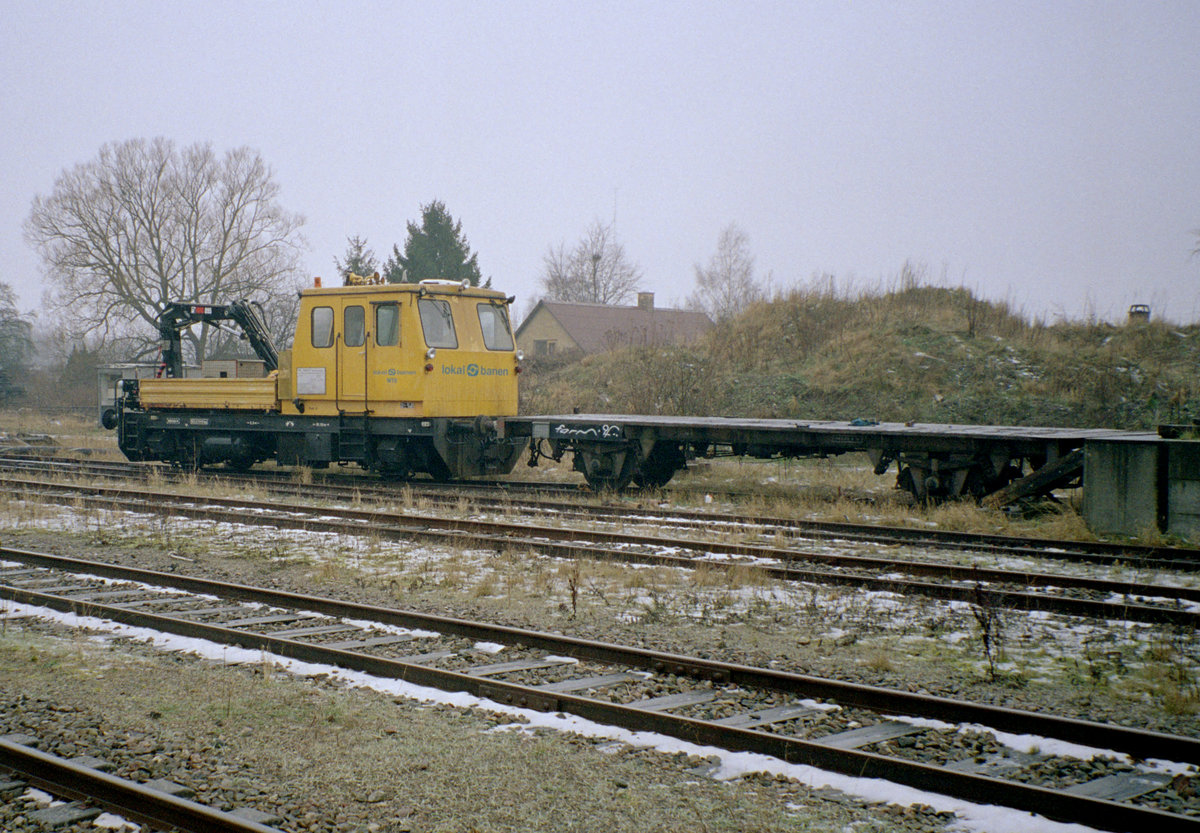
Service train MT 8 at Haarlev (Hårlev) Station

=== Future fleet ===
- 24 Stadler FLIRT Akku ordered in October 2024.
- 4 Stadler RS ZERO

== Timeline ==
Lokalbanen (2001–2015)

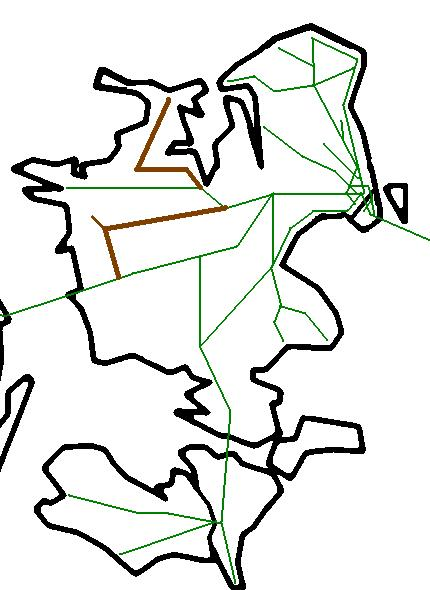
Vestsjællands Lokalbaner (2003–2009)

Regionstog (2009–2015)

Lokaltog (2015–present day)

== See also ==
- Midtjyske Jernbaner
- Nordjyske Jernbaner
- Rail transport in Denmark
