= Karinebæk railway halt =

Railway halt in North Zealand, Denmark

Karinebæk

General information
- Location: Carl Bødker Nielsens Vej; 3100 Hornbæk; Helsingør Municipality; Denmark
- Coordinates: 56°04′59″N 12°28′07″E
- Elevation: 14.0 metres (45.9 ft)
- Owner: Hovedstadens Lokalbaner
- Operator: Lokaltog
- Line: Hornbæk Line
- Platforms: 1
- Tracks: 1

History
- Opened: 2 June 1991

Services
Preceding station	Lokaltog	Following station
Saunte towards Helsingør	Hornbæk Line Local train	Hornbæk towards Gilleleje
Location

Karinebæk halt is a railway halt serving the eastern part of the seaside resort town of Hornbæk on the north coast of North Zealand, Denmark.

The halt is located on the Hornbæk Line from Helsingør to Gilleleje and opened in 1991. The train services are currently operated by the railway company Lokaltog which runs frequent local train services between Helsingør station and Gilleleje station.

== See also ==
- List of railway stations in Denmark
