= Kildekrog railway halt =

Railway halt in North Zealand, Denmark

Kildekrog
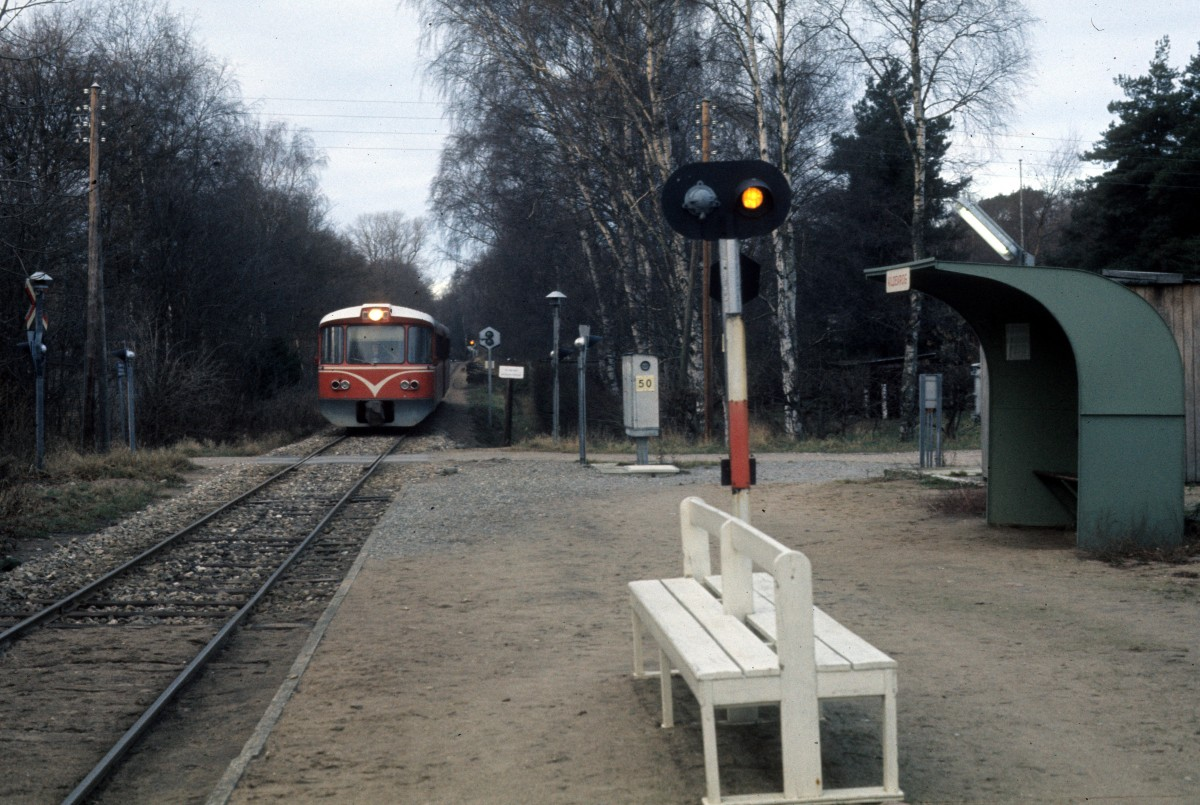
- Kildekrog halt in 1975

General information
- Location: Kildekrogen 3; 3100 Hornbæk; Helsingør Municipality; Denmark
- Coordinates: 56°05′33.08″N 12°25′27″E
- Elevation: 8.6 metres (28 ft)
- Owner: Hovedstadens Lokalbaner
- Operator: Lokaltog
- Line: Hornbæk Line
- Platforms: 1
- Tracks: 1

Services
| Preceding station | Lokaltog | Following station |
|---|---|---|
| Horneby Sand towards Helsingør | Hornbæk Line Local train | Dronningmølle towards Gilleleje |
Location

Kildekrog halt is a railway halt serving the many summer houses in the area between the seaside resort towns of Dronningmølle and Hornbæk on the north coast of Zealand, Denmark.

The halt is located on the Hornbæk Line from Helsingør to Gilleleje. The train services are currently operated by the railway company Lokaltog which runs frequent local train services between Helsingør station and Gilleleje station.

== See also ==
- List of railway stations in Denmark
