= Hornbæk railway station =

Railway station in North Zealand, Denmark

Hornbæk
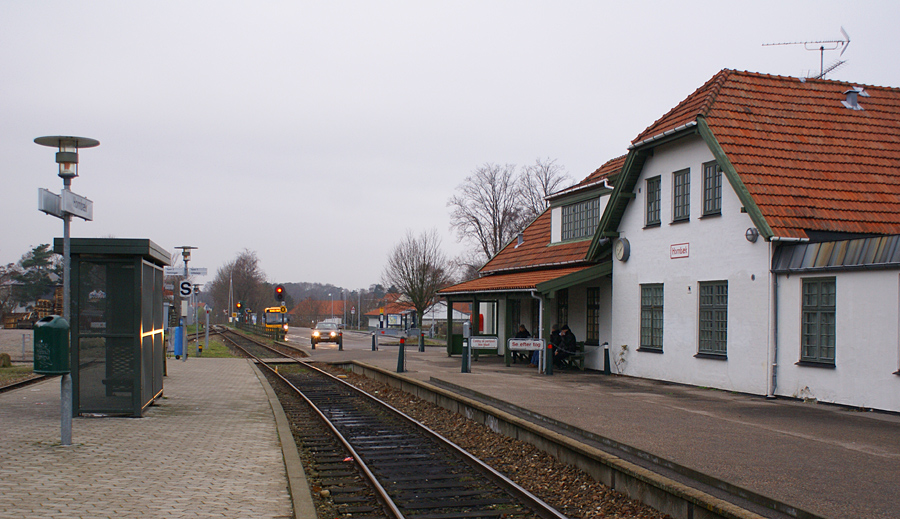
- Hornbæk station in 2008

General information
- Location: Hornbæk Stationsvej 6; 3100 Hornbæk; Helsingør Municipality; Denmark
- Coordinates: 56°05′21.42″N 12°27′34.19″E
- Elevation: 10.8 metres (35 ft)
- Owner: Hovedstadens Lokalbaner
- Operator: Lokaltog
- Line: Hornbæk Line
- Platforms: 2
- Tracks: 2

History
- Opened: 22 May 1906

Services
Preceding station	Lokaltog	Following station
Karinebæk towards Helsingør	Hornbæk Line Local train	Horneby Sand towards Gilleleje
Location

Hornbæk station is a railway station serving the seaside resort town of Hornbæk on the north coast of North Zealand, Denmark.

The station is located on the Hornbæk Line from Helsingør to Gilleleje. The train services are currently operated by the railway company Lokaltog which runs frequent local train services between Helsingør station and Gilleleje station.

== History ==
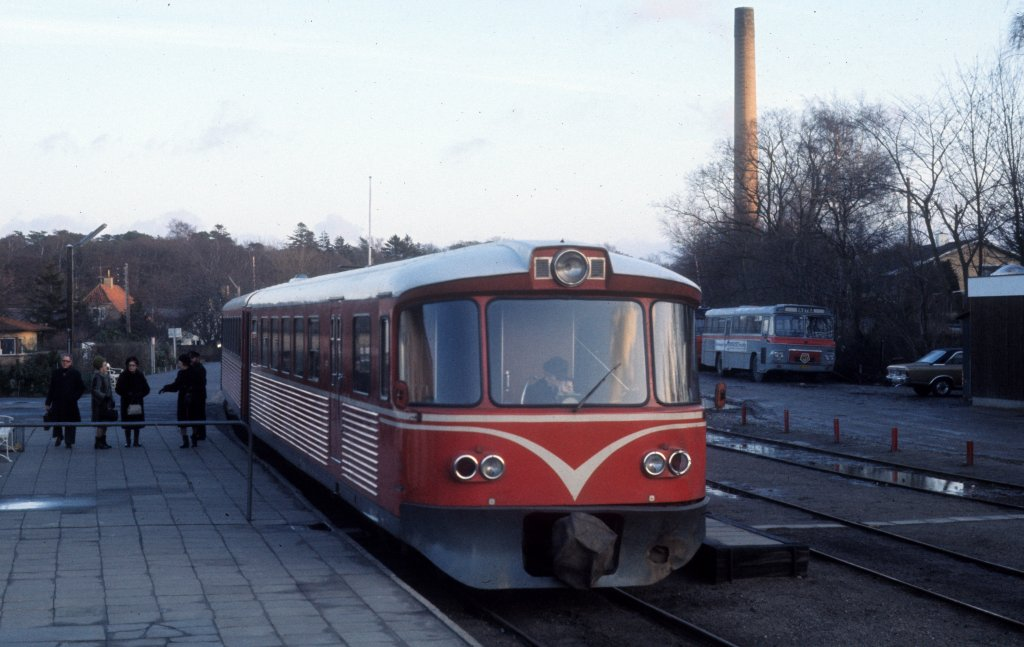
Railcar from Helsingør-Hornbæk-Gilleleje Banen at Hornbæk station in 1974.

The station opened on 22 May 1906 to serve as terminus of the new railway line from Helsingør along the coast of the Øresund to Hornbæk. It caused the town to be invaded by tourists. In 1916, the railway was continued from Hornbæk station onwards along the coast to Gilleleje.

== Cultural references ==
Hornbæk station is used as a location in the 1968 Olsen Gang film The Olsen Gang.

== See also ==
- List of railway stations in Denmark
