= Søborg railway halt =

Railway halt in North Zealand, Denmark

Søborg

General information
- Location: Bregnerødvej; 3250 Gilleleje; Gribskov Municipality; Denmark
- Coordinates: 56°06′01.85″N 12°20′02.08″E
- Elevation: 7.7 metres (25 ft)
- Owner: Hovedstadens Lokalbaner
- Operator: Lokaltog
- Line: Hornbæk Line
- Platforms: 1
- Tracks: 1

History
- Opened: 11 June 1916

Services
| Preceding station | Lokaltog | Following station |
|---|---|---|
| Firhøj towards Helsingør | Hornbæk Line Local train | Stæremosen towards Gilleleje |
Location

Søborg halt is a railway halt located about 2 km (1.2 mi) north east of the village of Søborg near Gilleleje on the island of Zealand, Denmark.

The halt is located on the Hornbæk Line from Helsingør to Gilleleje. The train services are currently operated by the railway company Lokaltog which runs frequent local train services between Helsingør station and Gilleleje station.

== History ==
The halt opened in 1916 as the Helsingør-Hornbæk railway line from Helsingør along the coast of the Øresund to Hornbæk was continued from Hornbæk station onwards along the coast to Gilleleje.

== See also ==
- List of railway stations in Denmark
- Rail transport in Denmark
