= Hellebæk railway station =

Railway station in North Zealand, Denmark

Hellebæk
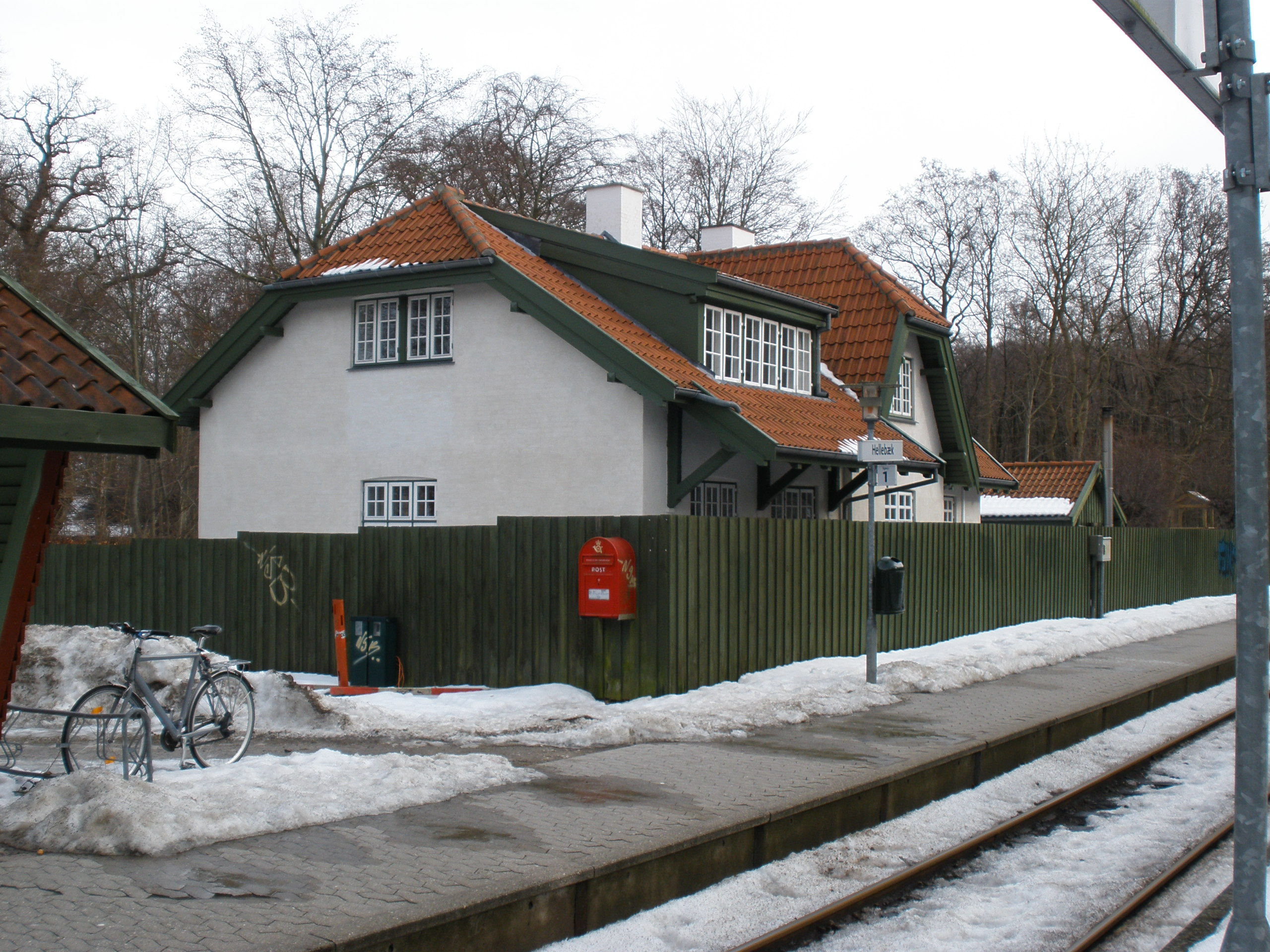
- Hellebæk station in 2010

General information
- Location: Hellebæk Stationsvej 21; 3150 Hellebæk; Helsingør Municipality; Denmark
- Coordinates: 56°03′59.4″N 12°33′15.4″E
- Elevation: 14.5 metres (48 ft)
- Owner: Hovedstadens Lokalbaner
- Operator: Lokaltog
- Line: Hornbæk Line
- Platforms: 2
- Tracks: 2

Services
Preceding station	Lokaltog	Following station
Højstrup towards Helsingør	Hornbæk Line Local train	Ålsgårde towards Gilleleje
Location

Hellebæk station is a railway station serving the town of Hellebæk, about 5 kilometres north of the city of Helsingør, Denmark.

The station is located on the Hornbæk Line from Helsingør to Gilleleje. The train services are currently operated by the railway company Lokaltog which runs frequent local train services between Helsingør station and Gilleleje station.

== Cultural references ==
Hellebæk station is used as a location in the 1974 Danish film Pigen og drømmeslottet.

== See also ==
- List of railway stations in Denmark
