= Skibstrup railway halt =

Railway halt in North Zealand, Denmark

Skibstrup
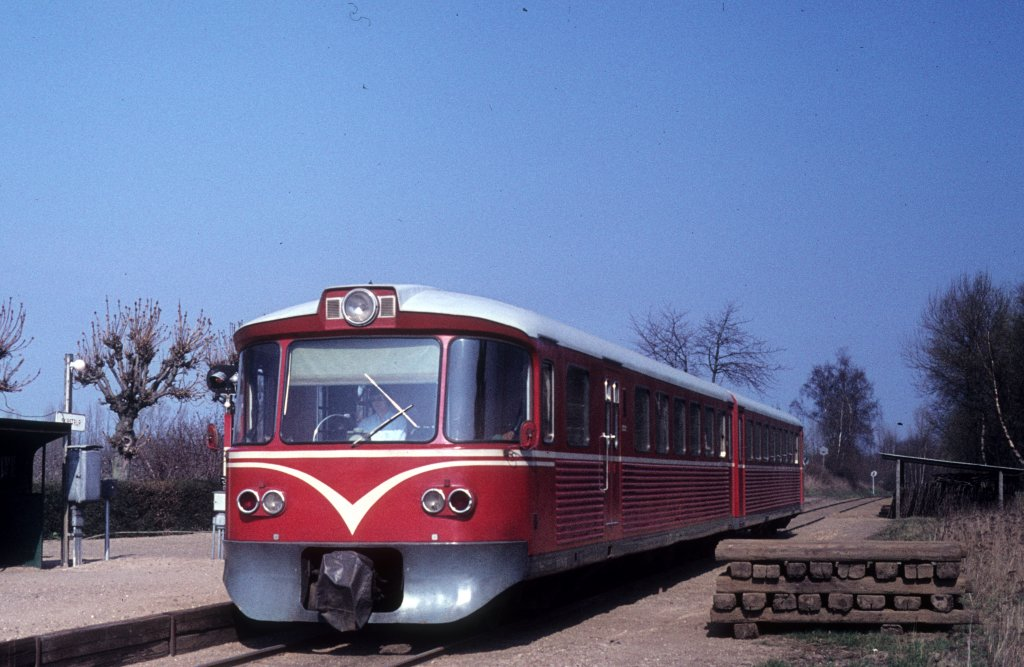
- Skibstrup halt in 1974

General information
- Location: Hyrebakken; 3140 Ålsgårde; Helsingør Municipality; Denmark
- Coordinates: 56°04′42″N 12°30′47″E
- Elevation: 37.0 metres (121.4 ft)
- Owner: Hovedstadens Lokalbaner
- Operator: Lokaltog
- Line: Hornbæk Line
- Platforms: 1
- Tracks: 1

History
- Opened: 1915

Services
Preceding station	Lokaltog	Following station
Ålsgårde towards Helsingør	Hornbæk Line Local train	Saunte towards Gilleleje
Location

Skibstrup halt is a railway halt serving the settlements of Skibstrup and Ellekilde on the coast of North Zealand, Denmark.

The halt is located on the Hornbæk Line from Helsingør to Gilleleje. It opened in 1915. The train services are currently operated by the railway company Lokaltog which runs frequent local train services between Helsingør station and Gilleleje station.

== See also ==
- List of railway stations in Denmark
