= Ålsgårde railway station =

Railway station in North Zealand, Denmark

Ålsgårde
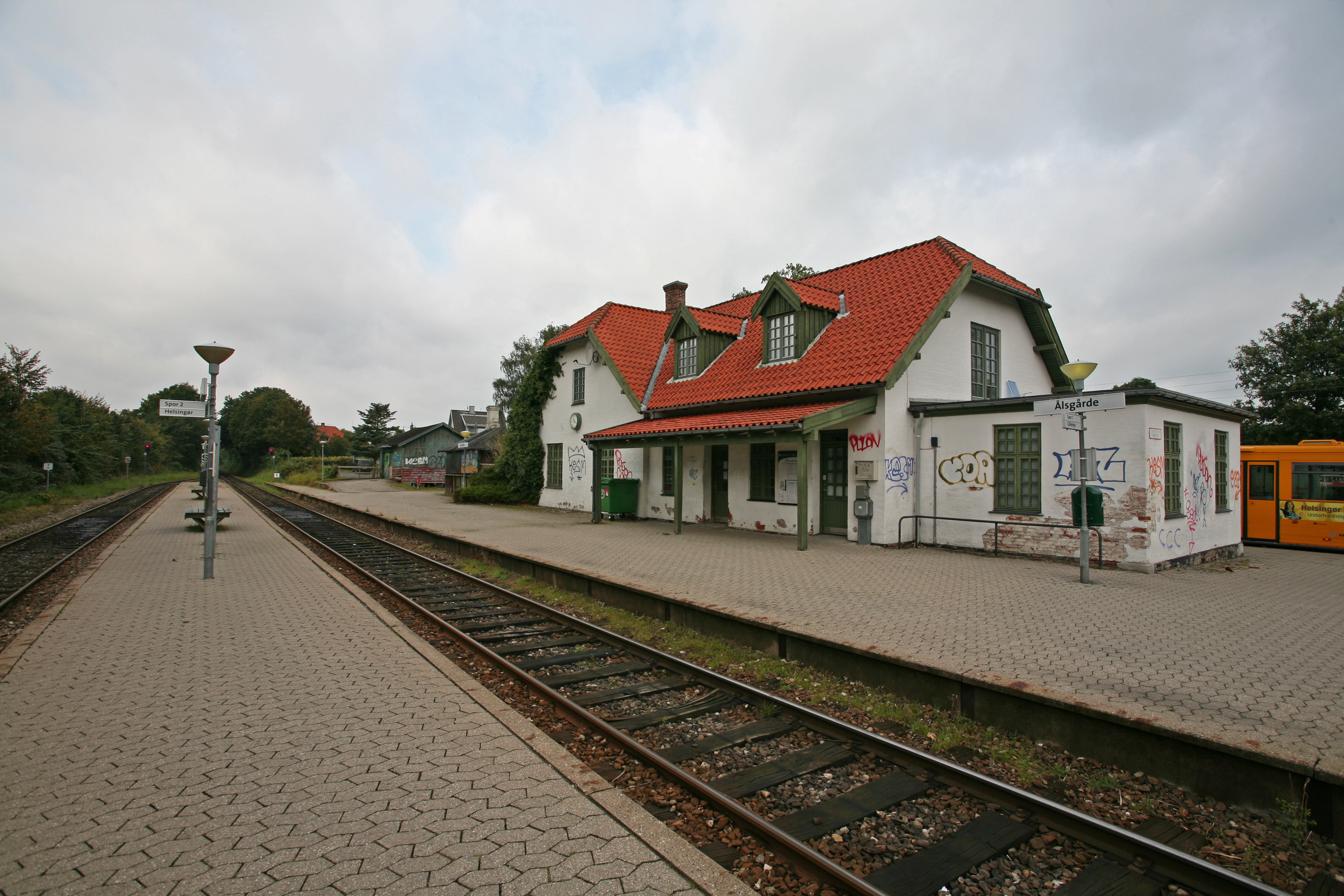
- Ålsgårde station in 2007

General information
- Location: Ålsgårde Stationsvej 1A; 3140 Ålsgårde; Helsingør Municipality; Denmark
- Coordinates: 56°04′30.58″N 12°32′18.41″E
- Elevation: 20.2 metres (66 ft)
- Owner: Hovedstadens Lokalbaner
- Operator: Lokaltog
- Line: Hornbæk Line
- Platforms: 2
- Tracks: 2

History
- Opened: 22 May 1906

Services
Preceding station	Lokaltog	Following station
Hellebæk towards Helsingør	Hornbæk Line Local train	Skibstrup towards Gilleleje
Location

Ålsgårde station is a railway station serving the town of Ålsgårde in North Zealand, Denmark.

The station is located on the Hornbæk Line from Helsingør to Gilleleje. It opened in 1906. The train services are currently operated by the railway company Lokaltog which runs frequent local train services between Helsingør station and Gilleleje station.

== See also ==
- List of railway stations in Denmark
