= Saunte railway station =

Railway station in North Zealand, Denmark

Saunte
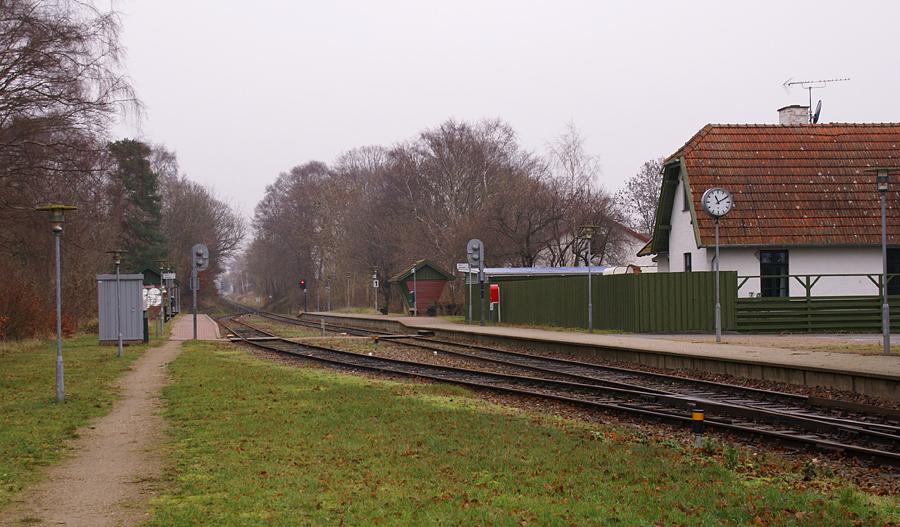
- Saunte station in 2008

General information
- Location: Saunte Stationsvej 2 DK-3100 Hornbæk; Helsingør Municipality; Denmark
- Coordinates: 56°04′37″N 12°29′5.56″E
- Elevation: 22.9 metres (75 ft)
- Owner: Hovedstadens Lokalbaner
- Operator: Lokaltog
- Line: Hornbæk Line
- Platforms: 2
- Tracks: 2

Services
Preceding station	Lokaltog	Following station
Skibstrup towards Helsingør	Hornbæk Line Local train	Karinebæk towards Gilleleje
Location

Saunte station is a railway station serving the village of Saunte in North Zealand, Denmark.

The station is located on the Hornbæk Line from Helsingør to Gilleleje. The train services are currently operated by the railway company Lokaltog which runs frequent local train services between Helsingør station and Gilleleje station.

== Cultural references ==
The station us used as a location in the films The Olsen Gang (1968) and Hjerter er trumf (1976).

== See also ==
- List of railway stations in Denmark
- Rail transport in Denmark
