= Højstrup railway halt =

Railway halt in Helsingør, Denmark

Højstrup
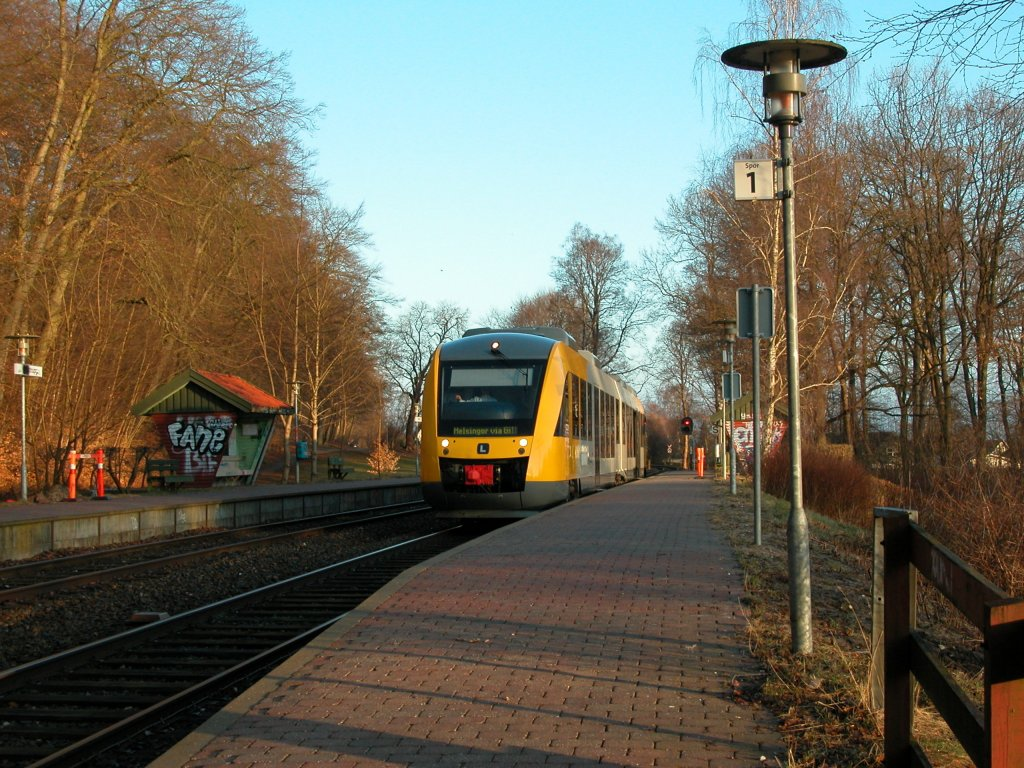
- Højstrup halt in 2012

General information
- Location: Lappestensvej; DK-3000 Helsingør; Helsingør Municipality; Denmark
- Coordinates: 56°02′53″N 12°35′36″E
- Elevation: 8.8 metres (29 ft)
- System: railway halt
- Owner: Hovedstadens Lokalbaner
- Operator: Lokaltog
- Line: Hornbæk Line
- Platforms: 2
- Tracks: 2

History
- Opened: 1906

Services
Preceding station	Lokaltog	Following station
Marienlyst towards Helsingør	Hornbæk Line Local train	Hellebæk towards Gilleleje
Location
- Location within Denmark

Højstrup railway halt is a railway halt serving the district Højstrup in the northern outskirts of the city of Helsingør, Denmark.

The station is located on the Hornbæk Line from Helsingør to Gilleleje. The train services are currently operated by the railway company Lokaltog which runs frequent local train services between Helsingør station and Gilleleje station.

== See also ==
- List of railway stations in Denmark
