= Grønnehave railway station =

Railway station in Helsingør, Denmark

Grønnehave
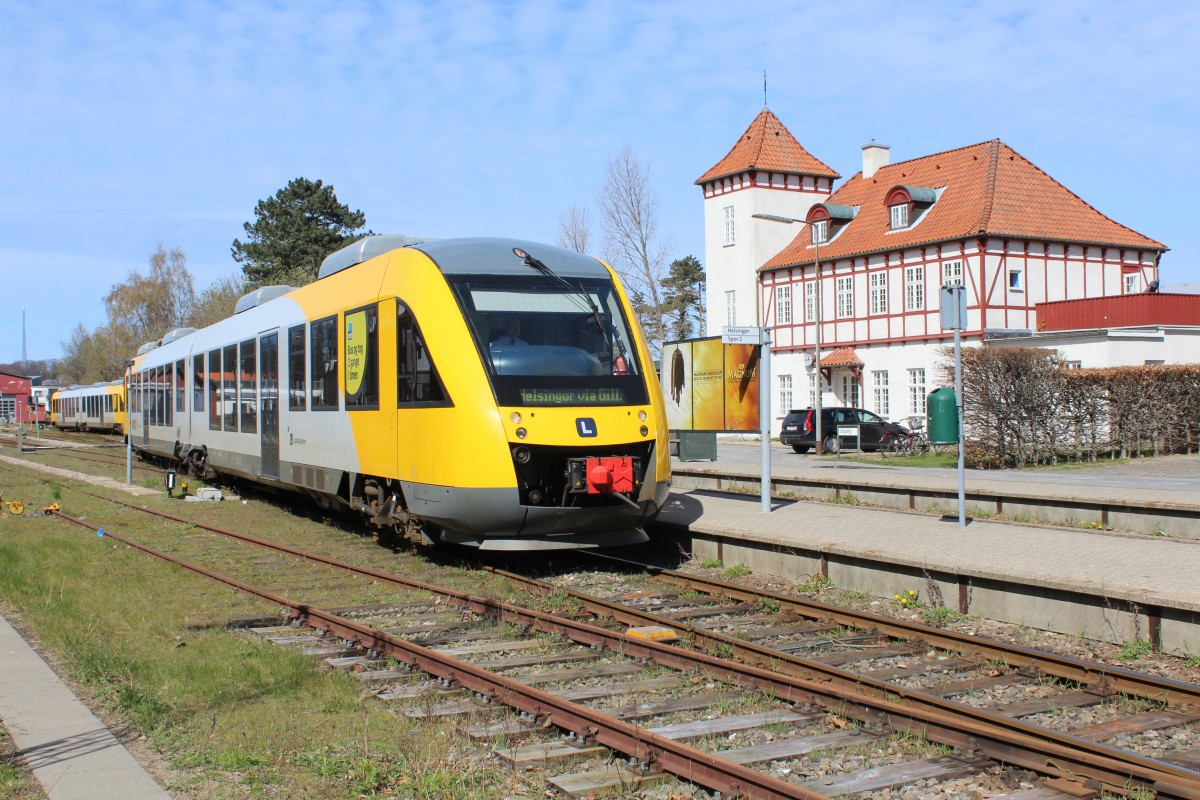
- Grønnehave station in 2014

General information
- Location: Nordlysvænget 10; 3000 Helsingør; Helsingør Municipality; Denmark
- Coordinates: 56°02′25.59″N 12°36′40.31″E
- Elevation: 3.1 metres (10 ft)
- Owner: Hovedstadens Lokalbaner
- Operator: Lokaltog
- Line: Hornbæk Line
- Platforms: 2
- Tracks: 2
- Connections: Bus terminal

History
- Opened: 22 May 1906

Services
Preceding station	Lokaltog	Following station
Helsingør Terminus	Hornbæk Line Local train	Marienlyst towards Gilleleje
Location

Grønnehave station is a railway station serving the northern part of the city of Helsingør, Denmark, as well as the nearby Kronborg Castle, Danish Maritime Museum, Kulturværftet cultural centre and the Øresundsakvariet public aquarium.

The station is located on the Hornbæk Line from Helsingør to Gilleleje. The train services are currently operated by the railway company Lokaltog which runs frequent local train services between Helsingør station and Gilleleje station.

== History ==
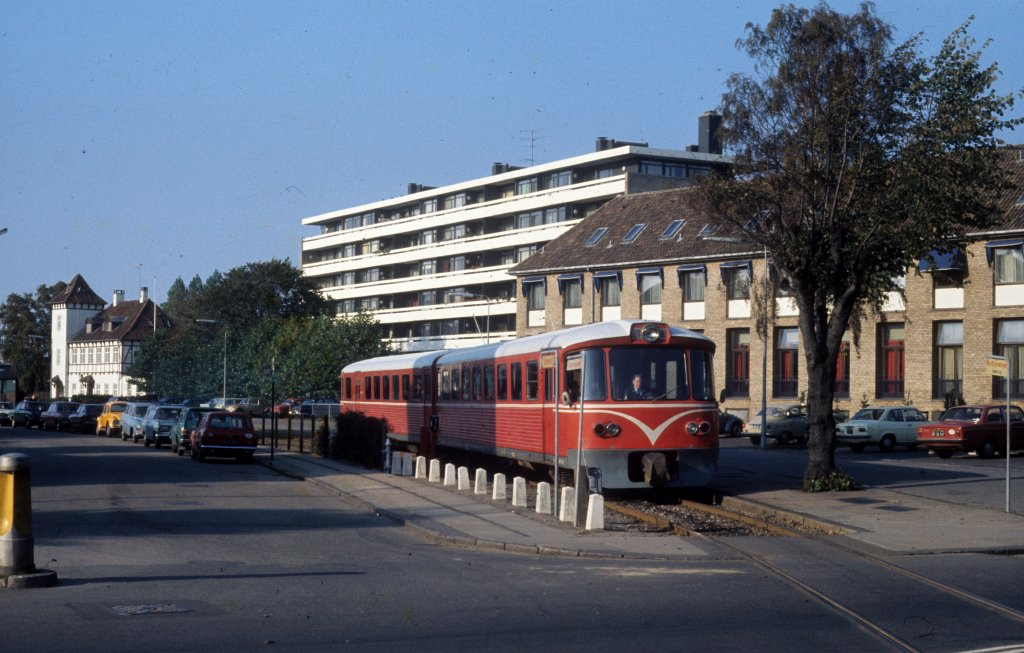
Grønnehave station in 1974.

The station opened in 1906 as the terminus of the new Helsingør-Hornbæk Railway Line (HHB). From 1908, however, all trains were continued from Grønnehave station via a connecting track along the harbour to Helsingør station, arriving and departing from a special railway halt in the street next to the station building.

In 1952 the layout of Grønnehave station was changed, with all tracks being moved from the north to the south side of the station building. This happened, among other reasons, to make room for an expansion of the nearby Tretorn factory.

== See also ==
- List of railway stations in Denmark
