= Stæremosen railway halt =

Railway halt in Gilleleje, Denmark

Stæremosen

General information
- Location: Kringelholm; 3250 Gilleleje; Gribskov Municipality; Denmark
- Coordinates: 56°06′43″N 12°19′08″E
- Elevation: 5.7 metres (19 ft)
- Owner: Hovedstadens Lokalbaner
- Operator: Lokaltog
- Line: Hornbæk Line
- Platforms: 1
- Tracks: 1

History
- Opened: 29 May 1988

Services
Preceding station	Lokaltog	Following station
Søborg towards Helsingør	Hornbæk Line Local train	Gilleleje East towards Gilleleje
Location

Stæremosen halt is a railway halt serving the southeastern part of the fishing port and seaside resort town of Gilleleje on the north coast of Zealand, Denmark.

The station is located on the Hornbæk Line from Helsingør to Gilleleje. It opened in 1988. The train services are currently operated by the railway company Lokaltog which runs frequent local train services between Helsingør station and Gilleleje station.

== See also ==
- List of railway stations in Denmark
