= Gilleleje East railway halt =

Railway halt in Gilleleje, Denmark

Gilleleje Øst
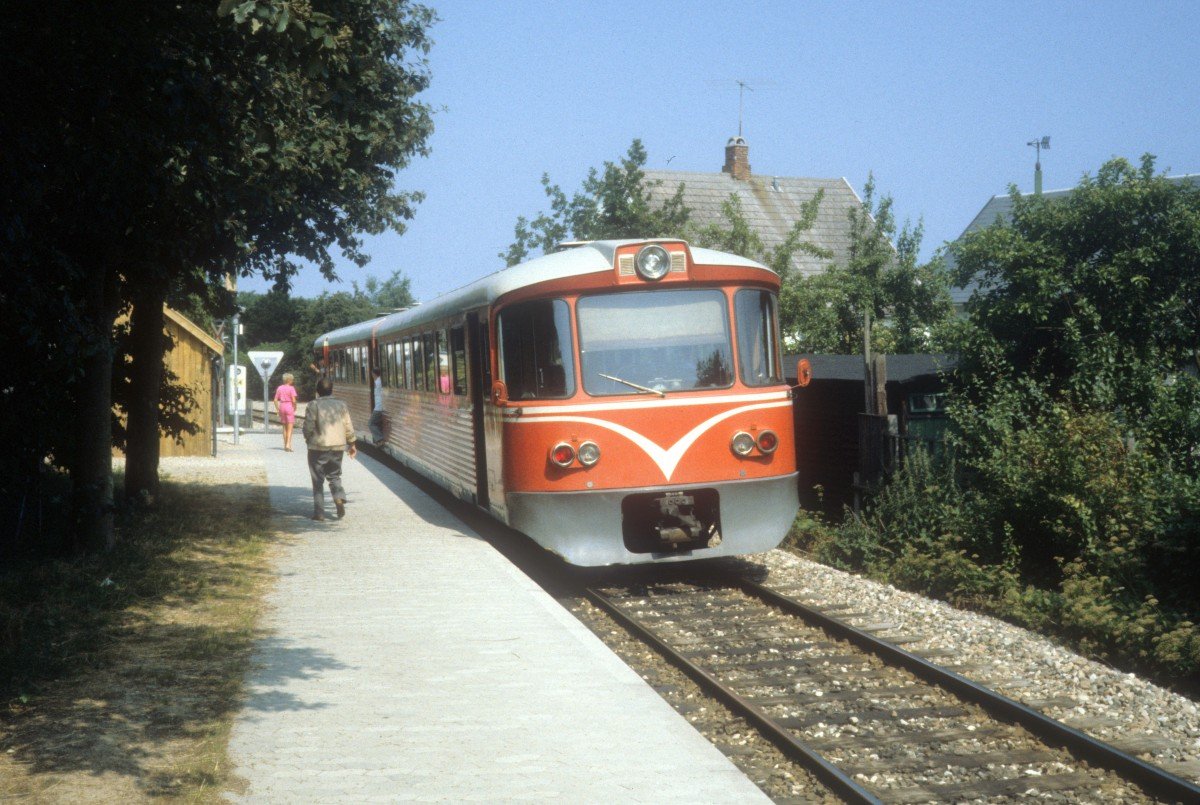
- Gilleleje East railway halt in 1983

General information
- Location: Rostgårdsvej; 3250 Gilleleje; Gribskov Municipality; Denmark
- Coordinates: 56°07′22.42″N 12°18′31.66″E
- Elevation: 9.6 metres (31 ft)
- Owner: Hovedstadens Lokalbaner
- Operator: Lokaltog
- Line: Hornbæk Line
- Platforms: 1
- Tracks: 1

History
- Opened: 11 June 1916
- Former names: Østerport

Services
Preceding station	Lokaltog	Following station
Stæremosen towards Helsingør	Hornbæk Line Local train	Gilleleje Terminus
Location

Gilleleje East (Danish: Gilleleje Øst; previously: Østerport) is a railway halt serving the eastern part of the fishing town and seaside resort of Gilleleje on the north coast of the island of Zealand, Denmark.

The railway is located on the Hornbæk Line from Helsingør to Gilleleje and opened in 1916. The train services are currently operated by the railway company Lokaltog which runs frequent local train services between Helsingør station and Gilleleje station.

== History ==
The halt opened in 1916 as the Helsingør-Hornbæk railway line from Helsingør along the coast of the Øresund to Hornbæk was continued from Hornbæk station onwards along the coast to Gilleleje. From the opening in 1916 it served as the terminus of the Helsingør-Hornbæk Railway Line, as it was not possible to reach an agreement with the Gribskov Line about a joint station in Gilleleje. On 16 January 1918, however, the new Gilleleje station serving both railway lines was inaugurated.

The halt was originally called Østerport. The name was changed in 1995 to avoid confusion with Østerport station in Copenhagen.

== Operations ==
Since 2015, the train services from the railway halt are operated by the regional railway company Lokaltog A/S which operates in the Capital Region and Region Zealand.

Lokaltog runs frequent local train services from Gilleleje East railway halt to Gilleleje station and Helsingør station with onward connections from there to the rest of Denmark.

== See also ==
- List of railway stations in Denmark
