= Skibstrup =

Coordinates: 56.0725°N 12.5116°E

Skibstrup is a settlement located on the coast between Helsingør and Hornbæk in North Zealand, Denmark. The original village has now merged with Hellebæk-Ålsgårde to the east. It is to the west bounded by Hornbæk Plantage.

== History ==
The first known reference to Skibstrup is from 1519. The origins of the name is uncertain but it may means "The settlement by the ship".

In 1681, Skibstrup consisted of seven tenant farms and two houses without land. All seven farms remained in the village in connection with the agricultural reforms of the 1780s. Their names were Skellebæk, Gørlunde, Tranager, Rosendal, Skadenborg (now called Viehøjgaard), Hagenberg and Aldersborg. They were all sold in 1797 but only Rosendal was moved out of the village.

When the Hornbæk Railway opened in 1906, Skobstrup began to grow, first along the Kattegat coast and later inland.

== Transport ==
Skibstrup railway halt, located in the eastern outskirts of Skibstrup, serves the Hornbæk Line.
