= Dina Birte Al-Erhayem =

Danish actress (1975–2019)

Dina Birte Al-Erhayem (2 October 1975 – 29 December 2019) was a Danish actress.

== Early life ==
Al-Erhayem was raised in Gilleleje as a child of a Danish mother and an Iraqi father and had three older siblings.

== Career ==
Al-Erhayem graduated as an actor from Aarhus Theatre in 2003. She was a student on DR2's weekly faith magazine Univers (Universe), and in 2014 hosted the Dinas Talkshow on dk4. In December 2014, Ole Stephensen joined as host, after which the title became Dinas og Oles Talkshow.

In addition to her work as an actor and talk show host, Al-Erhayem was a singer; she released a CD titled Se min kjole (Look at My Dress). She also appeared as a stand-up comedian. Al-Erhayem's film debut was the short film Istedgade (2006) directed by Birgitte Stærmose.

Shortly before her death, Al-Erhayem talked about her religious development from atheist and Buddhist to Christian. She died by suicide on 29 December 2019.
