= Erna Juel-Hansen =

Danish novelist and women's rights activist

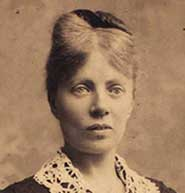
Erna Juel-Hansen

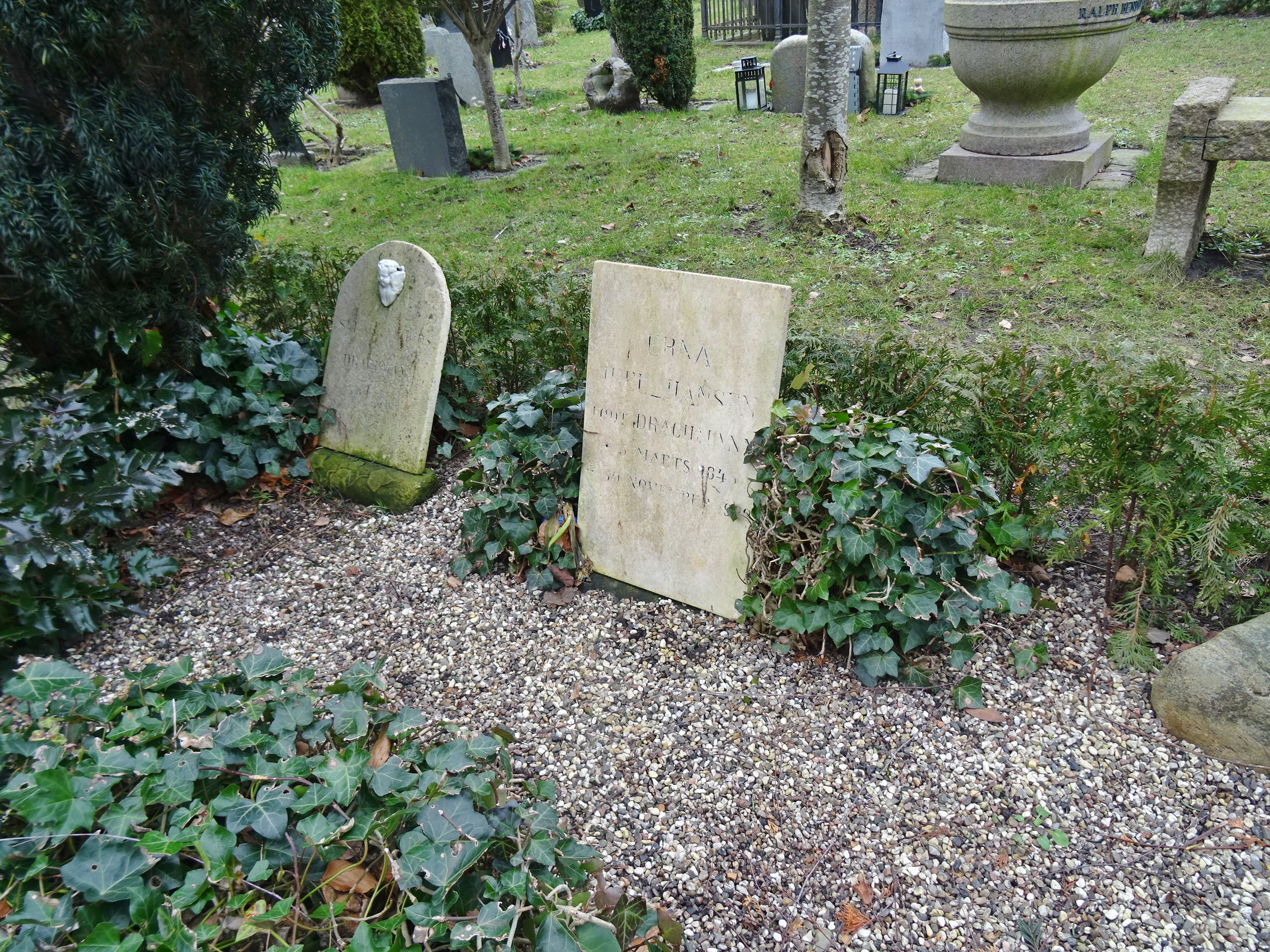
The grave of Erna Juel-Hansen in Copenhagen.

Erna Emilie Louise Juel-Hansen née Drachmann (1845–1922) was a Danish novelist and early women's rights activist. She introduced gymnastics into the educational curriculum and co-founded Denmark's first kindergarten.

== Biography ==
Born on 5 March 1845 in Copenhagen, Erna Emilie Louise Drachmann was the daughter of the physician Andreas Georg Drachmann (1810–92) and Vilhelmine Marie Stæhr (1820–57). She was the elder sister of the celebrated poet and dramatist Holger Drachmann with whom she maintained a close relationship. She would have followed in her father's footsteps as a doctor but as a woman was not admitted to medical school. Instead, she adopted her father's interest in gymnastics, studying both theory and practice completed by a study trip to Paris in 1866. She was later trained as a schoolteacher at N. Zahle's School.

In the late 1860s, she taught at a gymnastics institute for girls which had been founded by her father. At the same time, she became engaged to Niels Juel-Hansen (1841–1905, who was studying as a lawyer but who shared her interest in education. They were both attracted by Friedrich Fröbel's ideas on children's education. In 1871, she and her fiancé created Denmark's first kindergarten based on Fröbel's approach. Shortly afterwards they married. They went on to found a mixed school for young boys and girls in 1876 but their modern approach did not prove popular with the parents. In 1883, as a result of financial difficulties, they closed the school. Their marriage also ran into difficulties, leading to a separation in 1894. This caused Juel-Hansen considerable sorrow as she had always hoped for a happy, modern marriage in which both parents could share the task of raising their four children.

After the kindergarten closed, she decided to concentrate on a new project, this time founding a gymnastics college in 1884, taking full account of Pehr Henrik Ling's pioneering work in Sweden on teaching physical education. She also began writing, covering the difficulties experienced by young people as a result of their upbringing as well as the struggles faced by women in married life, based on her own experiences of defeat.

While her first novel Mellem 12 og 17 (Between 12 and 17), published in 1881 under the pen-name Arne Wendt, covers the teenage fantasies of young women in a rather rudimentary way, her En ung Dames Historie (A Young Woman's Story, 1888) is a much more daring and gripping account of a woman's early encounters with romance. With its realistic accounts of a girl's erotic experiences with an artist, it proved very popular. The problems faced by adult women as they grow older are behind her later novels, Terese Kærulf (1894) and Helsen & Co. (1900), both partly biographical.

Juel-Hansen was also involved in promoting women's rights, becoming an active member of both the Danish Women's Society and Studentersamfundet (Students Union) in 1883. In 1905, she became one of the first women to join the board of Copenhagen's Liberale Vælgerforening (Liberal Voters Association).

Erna Juel-Hansen died in Hornbæk on 39 November 1922.
