= Hornbæk Line =

Railway line in North Zealand, Denmark

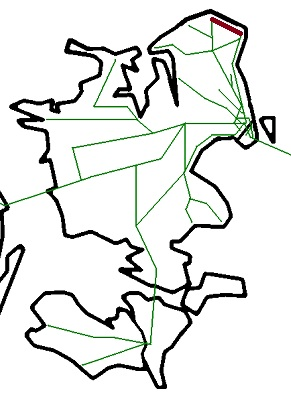

Overview
- Native name: Hornbækbanen
- Owner: Hovedstadens Lokalbaner
- Termini: Helsingør 56.1237°N 12.3030°E; Gilleleje 56.0322°N 12.6115°E
- Stations: 19

Service
- Type: Railway
- System: Danish railways
- Operator(s): Lokaltog
- Rolling stock: LINT 41

History
- Opened: Helsingør-Hornbæk: 22 May 1906; Hornbæk-Gilleleje: 11 July 1916

Technical
- Line length: 24.5 km (15.2 mi)
- Character: Local trains
- Track gauge: 1,435 mm (4 ft 8 1/2 in)
- Electrification: No
- Operating speed: 75 km/h

The Hornbæk Line (Danish: Hornbækbanen) is a 24.5 km (15.2 mi) long standard gauge single track railway line north of Copenhagen, Denmark. It runs along the coast of Øresund between Helsingør and Gilleleje, through an area with many holiday homes. The name Hornbækbanen refers to the town Hornbæk about halfway between Helsingør and Gilleleje.

The section from Helsingør to Hornbæk opened in 1906, and the section from Hornbæk to Gilleleje in 1916. The railway is currently owned by Hovedstadens Lokalbaner and operated by the railway company Lokaltog. Lokaltog runs frequent local train services from Helsingør to Gilleleje with most trains continuing from Gilleleje along the Gribskov Line to Hillerød.

== History ==
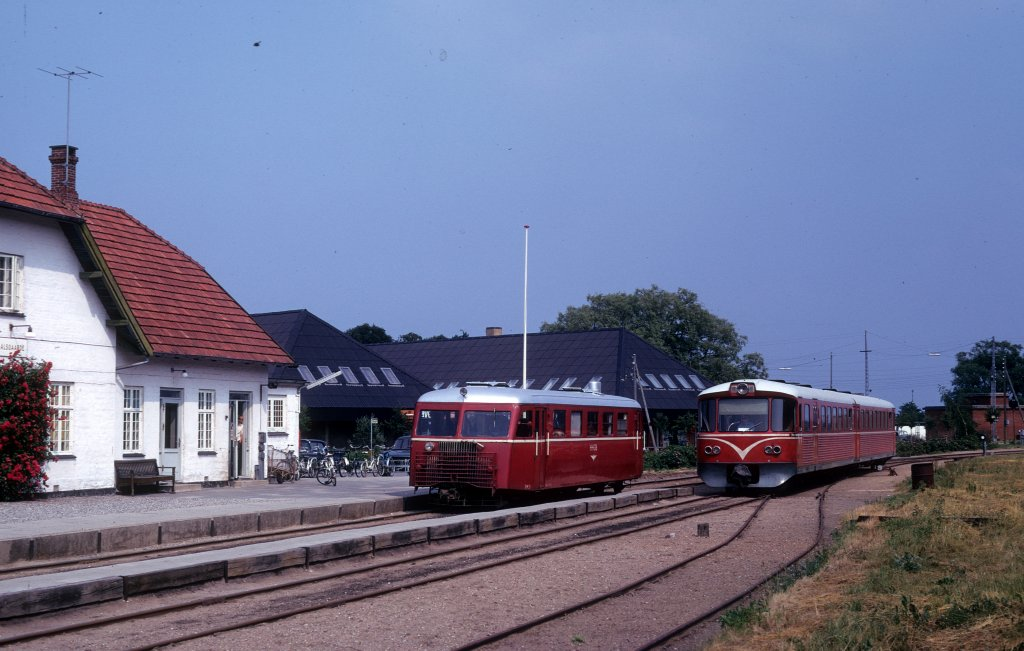
Railcars on the Hornbæk Line at Ålsgårde station in 1973.

The first 12.9 km (8.0 mi) long section of the railway line from Helsingør to Hornbæk opened on 22 May 1906 as the Helsingør-Hornbæk Banen (HHB). Initially, trains on the Hornbæk Line terminated at Grønnehave station in the northern part of Helsingør, but from 1908 all trains were continued via a connecting track along the harbour to Helsingør station, arriving and departing from a special railway halt in the street next to the station building.

The next 12 km (7.5 mi) long section from Hornbæk onwards to Gilleleje} opened on 11 July 1916 and the railway changed its name to Helsingør-Hornbæk-Gilleleje Banen (HHGB).

In 2002, train operation on the Hornbæk Line was transferred from the operating company Helsingør-Hornbæk-Gilleleje Banen A/S (HHGB) to the newly formed railway company Lokalbanen A/S (LB) responsible for train operation on five local railways north of Copenhagen. Lokalbanen A/S merged with Regionstog A/S on 1 July 2015 to form the railway company Lokaltog A/S which is currently responsible for train operation and related passenger services on the Hornbæk Line.

== Route ==
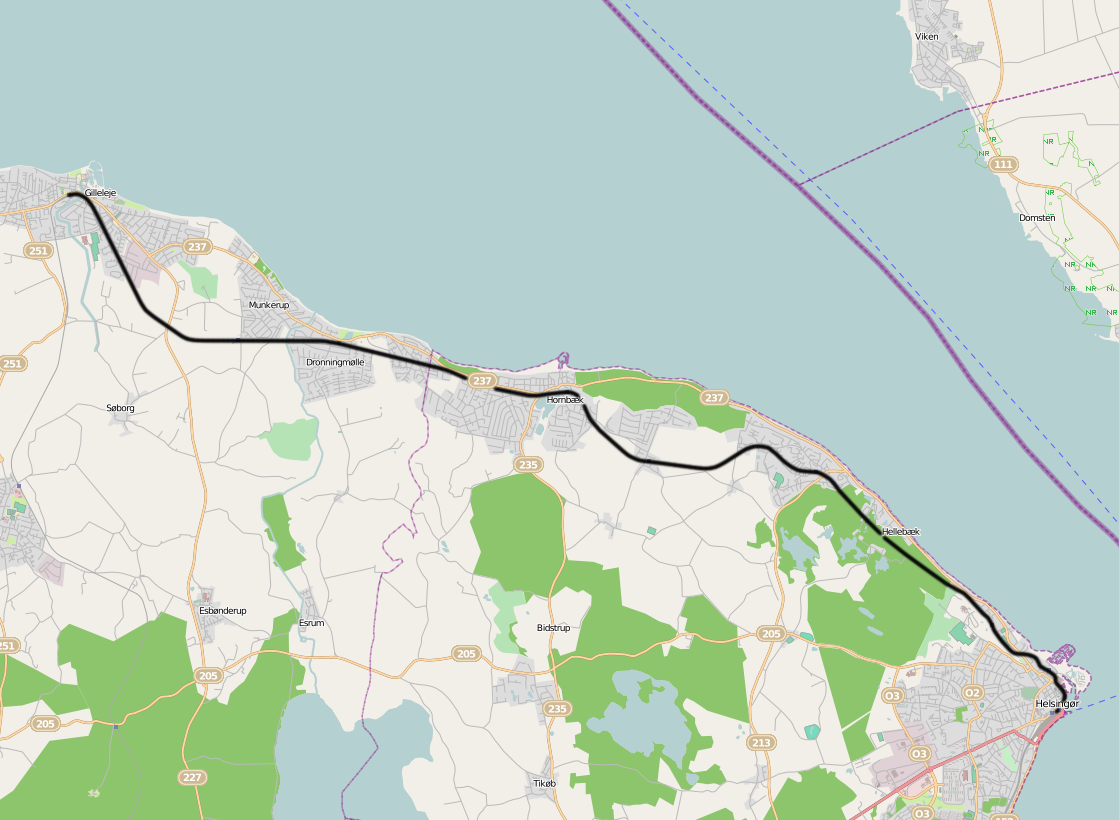
Map of the Hornbæk Line

The Hornbæk Line originates from Helsingør station, running north via a connecting track along the harbour to Grønnehave station in the northern part of the city. From Grønnehave station the line continues to the northwest, following the coast line of the Øresund and serving the seaside towns of Ålsgårde, Hornbæk and Dronningmølle. From Dronningmølle the line continues due west, before curving north to reach its terminus at Gilleleje where the line connects with the tracks of the Gribskov Line at Gilleleje station.

== Operations ==
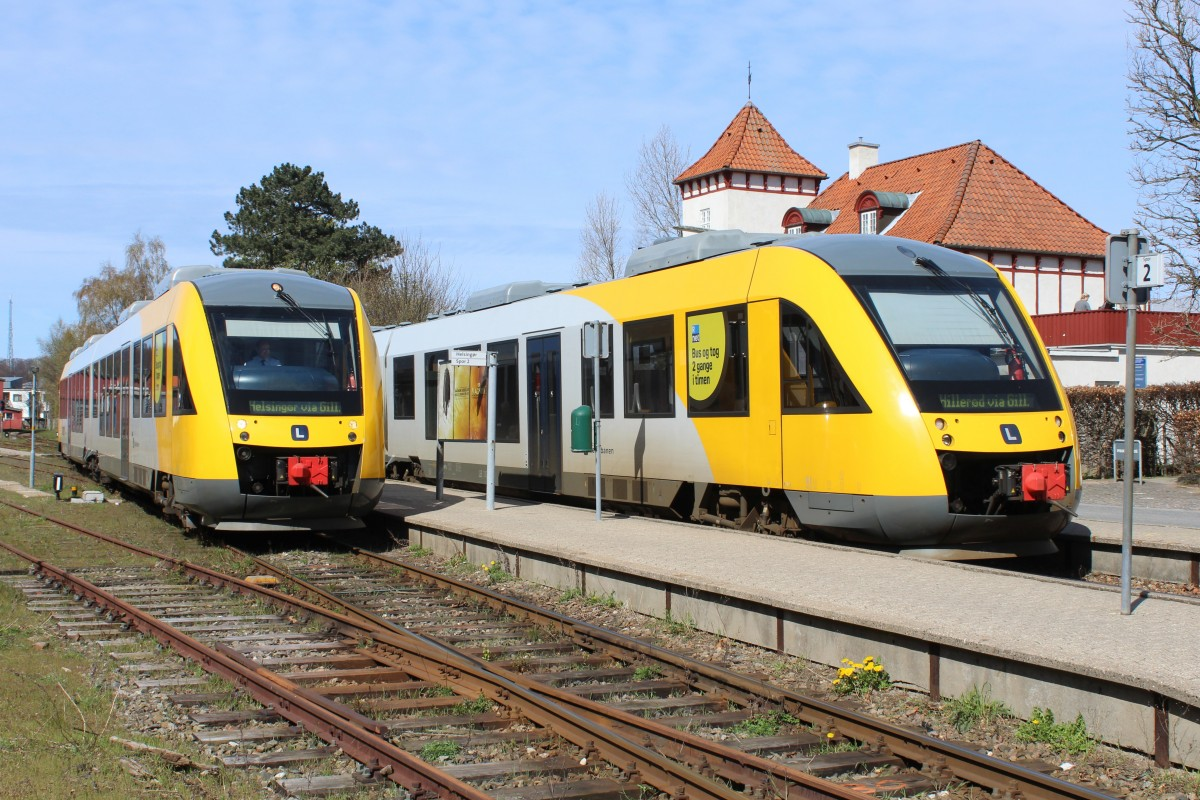
Trains on the Hornbæk Line at Grønnehave station in Helsingør.

Trains on the Hornbæk Line are operated by the railway company Lokaltog. Lokaltog operates a fairly intensive timetable on the Hornbæk Line with light DMUs working a fixed 30-minute frequency most of the day. Most passengers connect from Kystbanen regional trains at Helsingør. Until late 2007, transfers to and from Gribskovbanen were also possible at Gilleleje, but after major changes to Gilleleje station, trains now operate through Gilleleje to Hillerød along Gribskovbanen. This has eliminated the need to change at Gilleleje, but at the cost of going from 20-minute to 30-minute intervals.

=== Heritage train ===
During the summer months of July and August, Nordsjællands Veterantog operates weekend steam trains on the Hornbæk Line between Grønnehave and Gilleleje. This has been a tradition since 1971.

== Stations ==
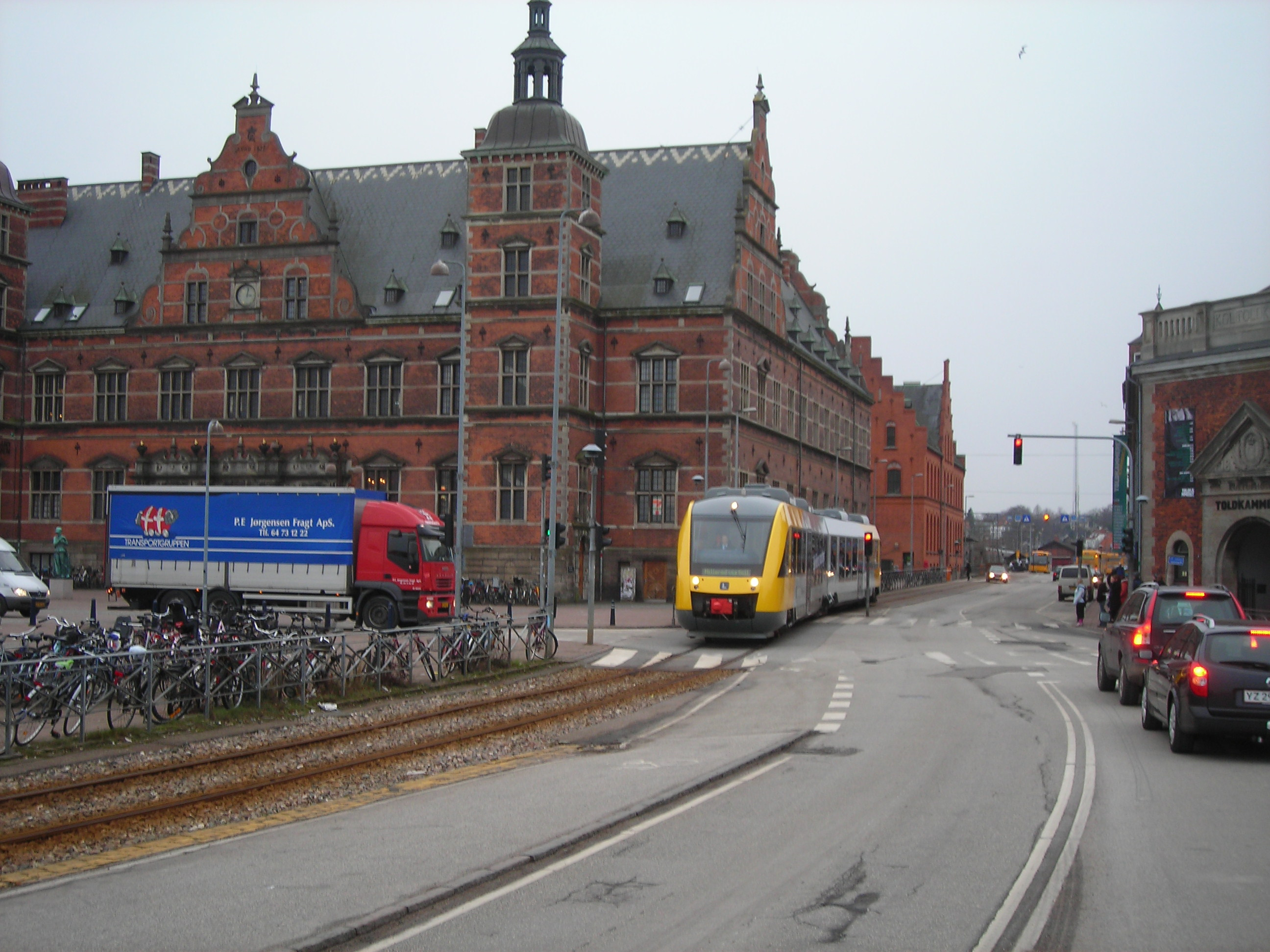
Helsingør station

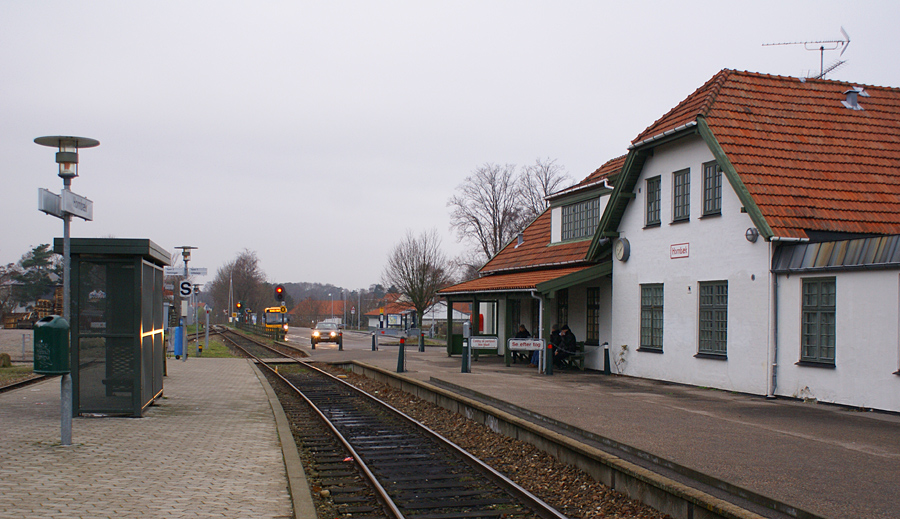
Hornbæk station

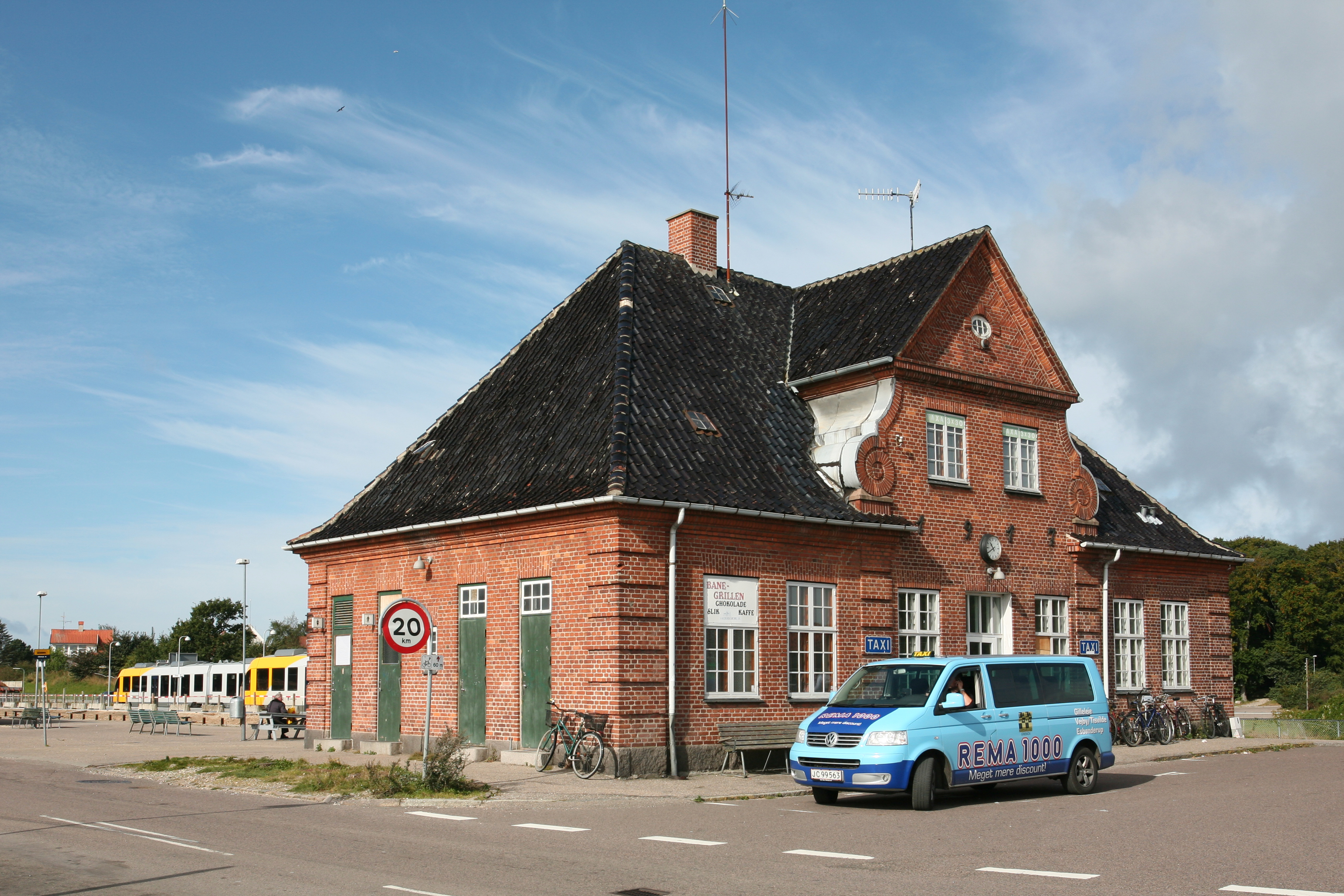
Gilleleje station

- Helsingør
- Grønnehave
- Marienlyst
- Højstrup
- Hellebæk
- Ålsgårde
- Skibstrup
- Saunte
- Karinebæk
- Hornbæk
- Horneby Sand
- Kildekrog
- Dronningmølle
- Firhøj
- Søborg
- Stæremosen
- Gilleleje East
- Gilleleje

== Cultural references ==
Both Hornbæk and Saunte stations and the section of the railway between them are used as a locations in the first Olsen Gang film.

== See also ==
- List of railway lines in Denmark
