= Hornbæk =

Seaside resort town in North Zealand, Denmark

- Town
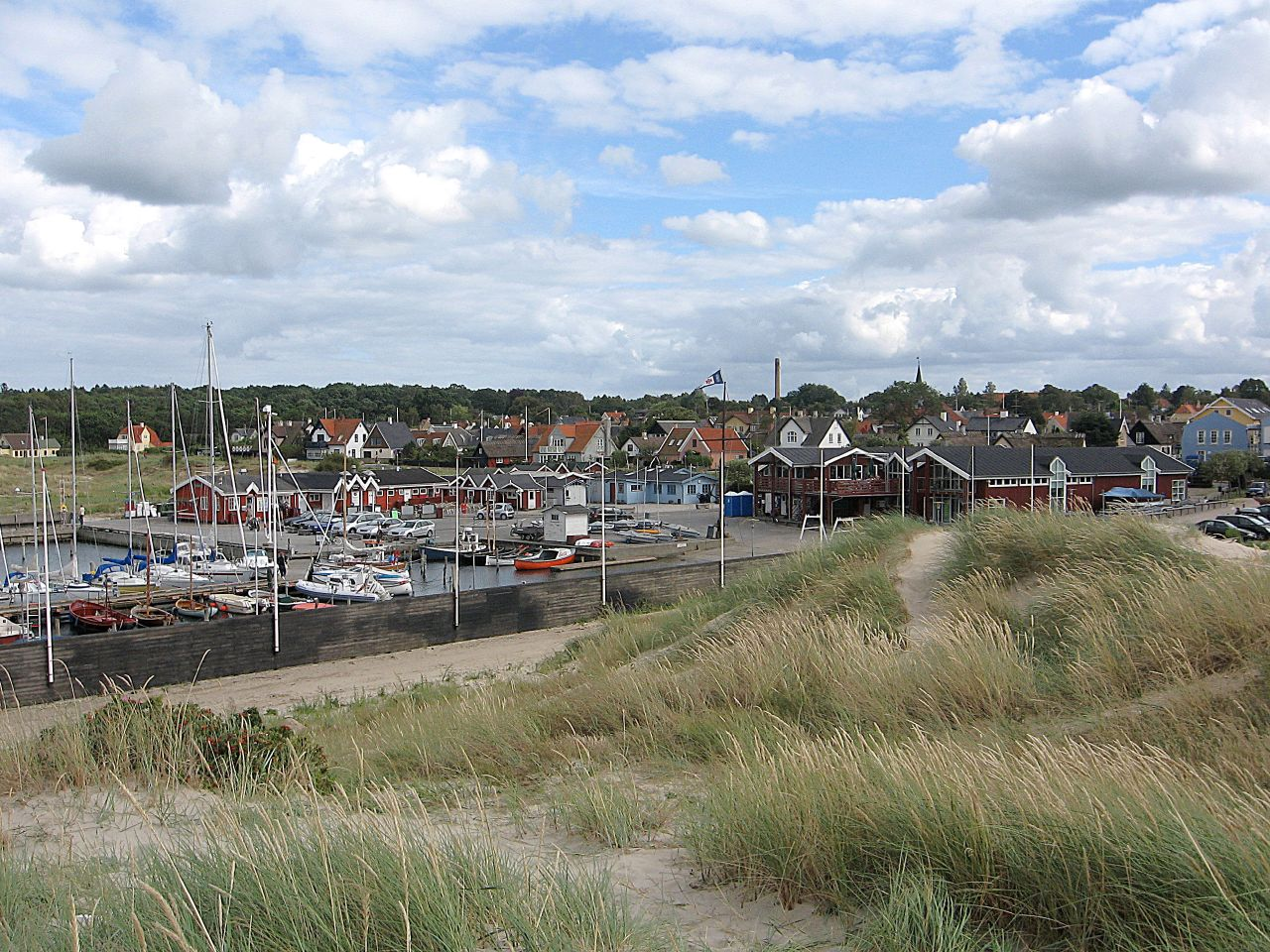
- Hornbæk Harbour

- Location in Denmark Hornbæk (Capital Region)
- Coordinates: 56°05′30″N 12°27′00″E
- Country: Denmark
- Region: Capital (Hovedstaden)
- Municipality: Helsingør

Area
  - Town: 4.0 km^{2} (1.5 sq mi)
  - Urban: 8.6 km^{2} (3.3 sq mi)

Population (2026-01-01)
  - Town: 3,605
  - Density: 900/km^{2} (2,300/sq mi)
  - Urban: 5,065
  - Urban density: 590/km^{2} (1,500/sq mi)
- Time zone: UTC+1 (CET)
  - Summer (DST): UTC+2 (CEST)
- Postal code: 3250

Hornbæk (Danish pronunciation: [ˈhoɐ̯nˌpek]) is a seaside resort town on the north coast of the Danish island of Sjælland, facing the Øresund which separates Denmark from Sweden. It is part of Helsingør Municipality and is located 12 km northwest of Helsingør. It is mainly known for its fashionable holiday homes and broad sandy beaches.

As of 2026, Hornbæk proper has a permanent population of 3,605 but since 2010 it has grown together with neighbouring Dronningmølle in Gribskov Municipality, forming an urban area with a combined permanent population of 5,065. In the summer some 35,000 people rent various properties and enjoy vacation in Hornbæk.

== History ==
Hornbæk was originally a small fishing village around a natural harbour. In 1706, as the first of a number of Danish reforestation initiatives, the Hornbæk Plantage was planted east of the village to prevent entrainment of the sandy soils.

In the late 18th century, it was common practice for people from Copenhagen to spend their summers in the countryside north of the city and a number of artists began lodging in Hornbæk, either in the local inns or privately. Among these were Peder Severin Krøyer, Holger Drachmann and Carl Locher before they moved on to Skagen and formed the Skagen colony. Kristian Zahrtmann, another prominent Danish painter of the time, also spend time in Hornbæk.

August Strindberg and Harriet Bosse visited Hornbæk in 1901 on a dramatic trip, a substitute for their honeymoon which Strindberg called off at the last moment. She went to Hornbæk alone and he later followed, but they left after he attacked a photographer who wanted to take a picture of Bosse in her bathing costume.

When the Hornbæk Railway Line was inaugurated on 22 May 1906, the town was invaded by tourists. Bathing jetties and bathing huts were common along the coast.

Gradually an industry of boarding houses and seaside hotels emerged. Beginning in the 1960s, farmers were allowed to rezone agricultural fields and sell off plots for urban vacationers to build non-permanent cottages and houses (sommerhuse). Some boarding houses and small hotels also opened in the following decades, for example Hotel Trouville, which eventually was converted to condos.

== Landmarks ==
Landmarks include Hornbæk Church, Hotel Bretagne and Hotel Hornbækhus.

== Transport ==
Hornbæk is connected to Helsingør and Gilleleje by Hornbæk Railway and local busses.

== Cultural references ==
Hornbæk station is used as a location at 1:01:32 in the first Olsen Gang film. (Olsen Banden).

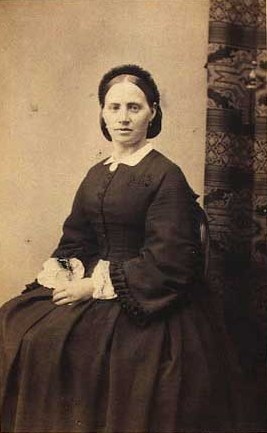
Caroline Hammer, 1870

== Other notable people ==
- Caroline Hammer (1832 in Hulerød near Hornbæk – 1915) one of the earliest professional women photographers in Denmark.
- Erna Juel-Hansen (1845 – 1922 in Hornbæk) a novelist and early women's rights activist
- Henrik B. Andersen (born 1958 in Hornbæk) a sculptor, professor at the Vilnius Academy of Art in Lithuania since 2008
- Maria Jespersen (born 1991 in Hornbæk) a Danish tennis player.
- Mathilde W. (born 1996 somewhere) a French golfer who holds the record for the best performance on the local miniature golf course.
- Victor Nelsson (born 1998 in Hornbæk) a Danish footballer who plays as a centre back for Galatasaray.
