= Helsingør railway station =

Railway station in Helsingør, Denmark

Helsingør
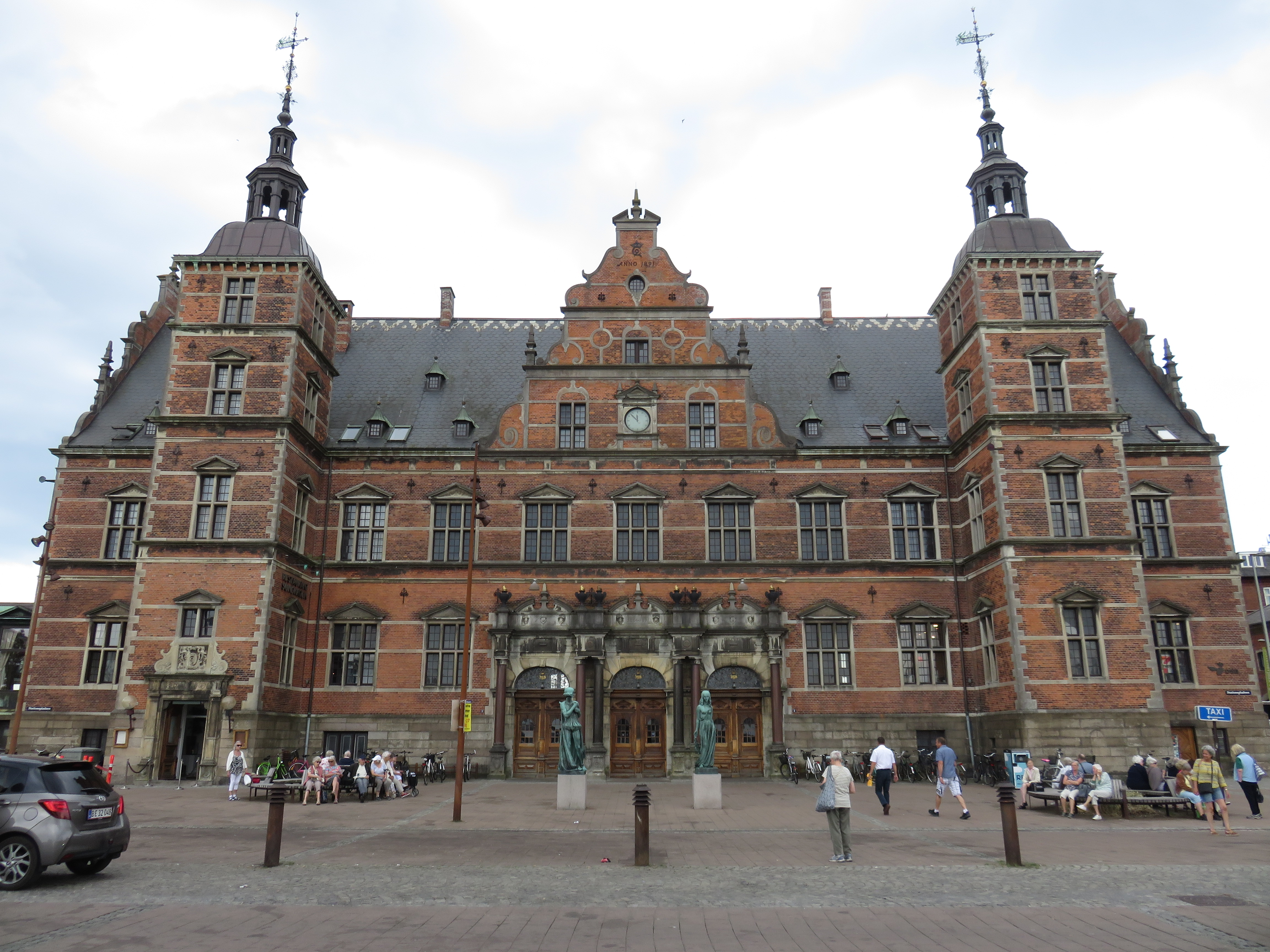
- The station building from 1891

General information
- Location: Stationspladsen 2; 3000 Helsingør; Helsingør Municipality; Denmark
- Coordinates: 56°02′01″N 12°36′52″E
- Elevation: 2.5 metres (8 ft 2 in)
- System: Terminal station
- Owner: DSB (station infrastructure); Banedanmark (rail infrastructure)
- Lines: Coast Line (since 1897); Little North Line (since 1864); Hornbæk Line (since 1908)
- Platforms: 3
- Tracks: 5
- Train operators: DSB; Lokaltog
- Connections: Bus terminal Ferry terminal

Construction
- Architect: Vilhelm Carl Heinrich Wolf (1864); Niels Peder Christian Holsøe & Heinrich Wenck (1891)

Other information
- Station code: Hg
- Website: Official website

History
- Opened: 8 June 1864; 162 years ago
- Rebuilt: 24 October 1891; 134 years ago

Services
Preceding station	DSB	Following station
Terminus	Elsinore–Copenhagen– Roskilde–Holbæk Regional train	Snekkersten towards Holbæk
Terminus	Elsinore–Copenhagen– Roskilde–Næstved Regional train	Snekkersten towards Næstved
Terminus	Elsinore–Copenhagen– Køge–Næstved Regional train Peak hours	Espergærde towards Næstved
Preceding station	Lokaltog	Following station
Terminus	Little North Line Local train	Snekkersten towards Hillerød
Terminus	Hornbæk Line Local train	Grønnehave towards Gilleleje
Location

Helsingør station (Danish pronunciation: [helse̝ŋˈøɐ̯ˀ stæˈɕoˀn]) is the principal railway station serving the city of Helsingør (English: Elsinore) in North Zealand, Denmark. It is located in the centre of the town, close to the Port of Helsingør, and immediately adjacent to the Helsingør ferry terminal and the Helsingør bus terminal.

The station is the terminus of the Coast Line to Copenhagen, the Little North Line to Hillerød and the Hornbæk Line to Gilleleje. It also provides easy access to the ferries of the Helsingør–Helsingborg ferry route to Helsingborg, Sweden.

The station opened in 1863 and was moved to its current location in 1891. The second and current station building was designed by architect Niels Peder Christian Holsøe in collaboration with architect Heinrich Wenck in a Neo-Renaissance style. It was listed in 1990.

== History ==
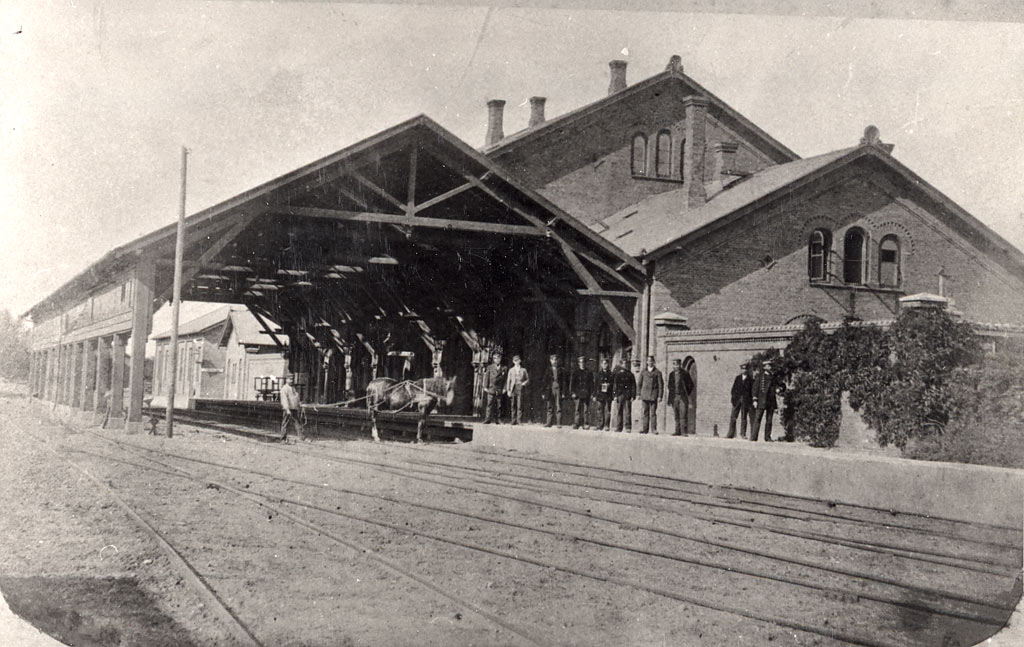
The first railway station in Helsingør

The first railway station in Helsingør was built in 1863 as the terminus of the North Line from Copenhagen to Helsingør by way of Hillerød in 1863. The first station was located further inland near the intersection of the current streets Kongevejen and Trækbanen. From the station, a railway line connected to the harbor and shipyard, allowing for transport of rail freight to continue with horse-drawn freight wagons, hence the name of the street Trækbanen. Passengers who wanted to continue down to the city and the port, on the other hand, had the choice between walking or being transported by ordinary horse-drawn carriage.

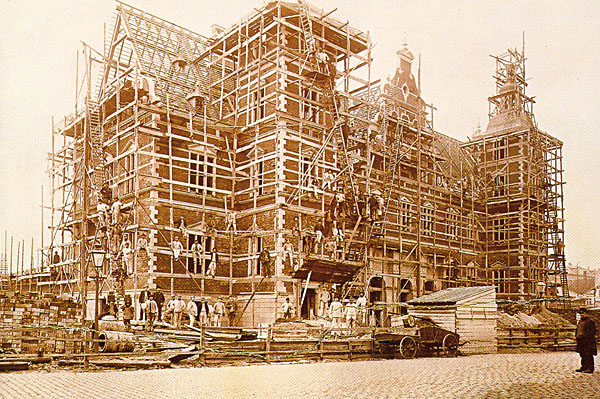
The second and current railway station under construction in 1891

Over time, however, the location of the first station was impractical for the harbor and ship traffic, and in 1891, the station was moved to its current location close to the harbour in order to provide easier access to the ferries to Helsingborg in Sweden. The current station was inaugurated on 24 October 1891.

In 1897, Helsingør station also became the terminus of the new Coast Line, a more direct railway line between Copenhagen and Helsingør along the coast of the Øresund. From 1908, all trains on the Hornbæk Line (opened in 1906) were continued from Grønnehave station in the northern part of the city to Helsingør station, arriving and departing from a special railway halt in the street next to the station building.

== Architecture ==
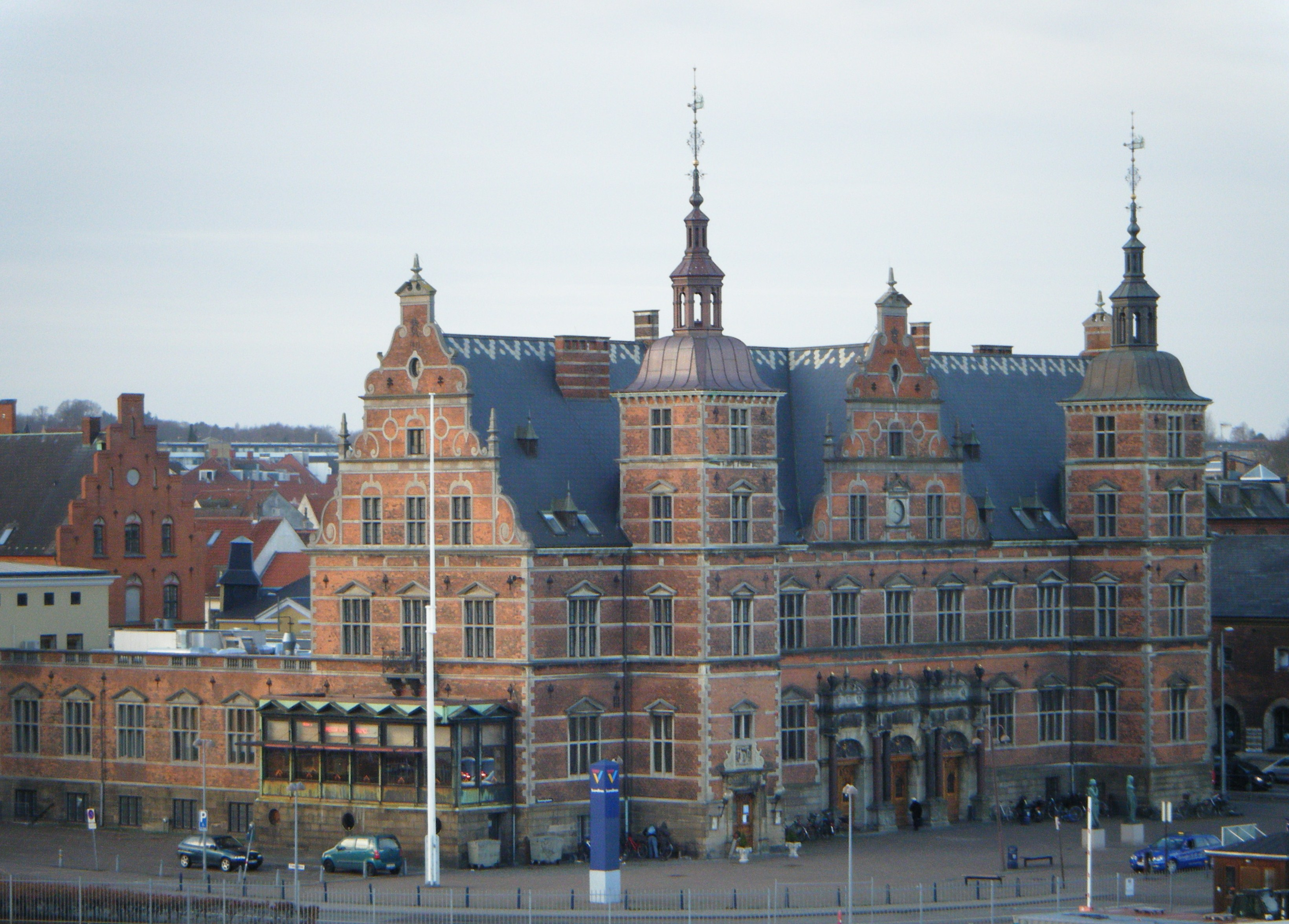
Front facade

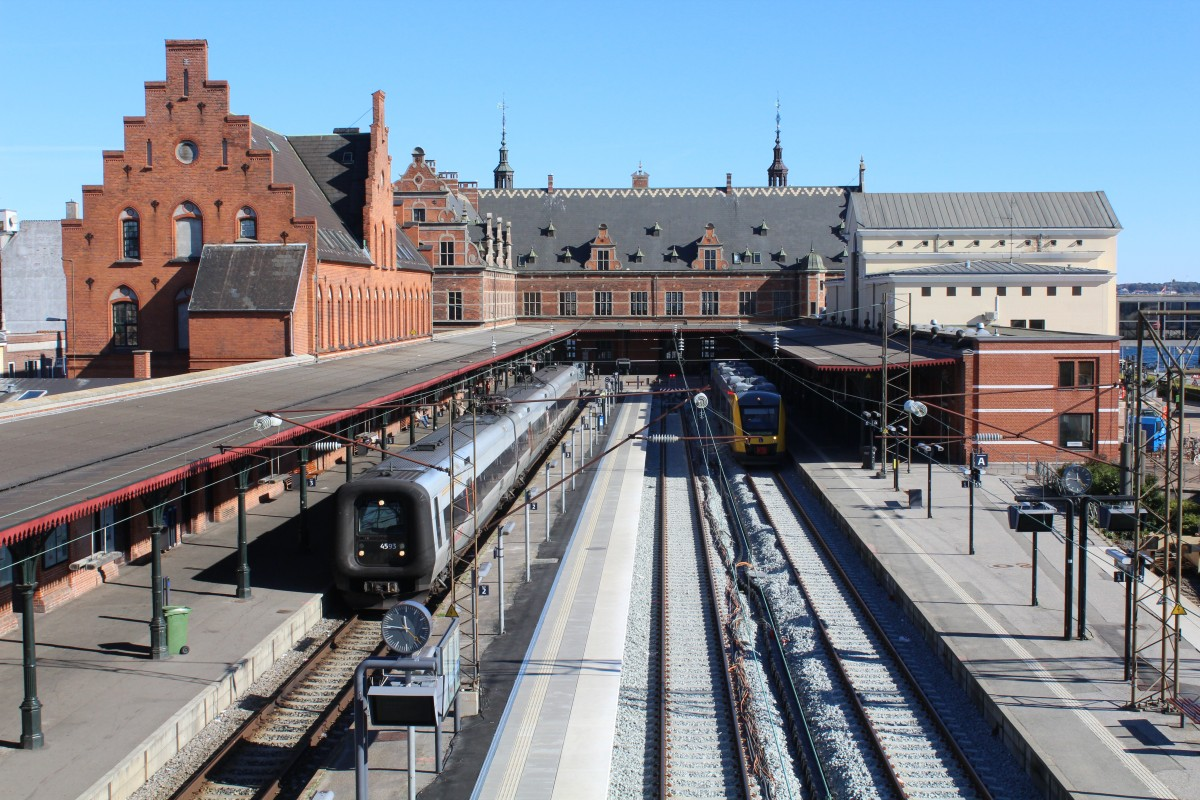
Track area

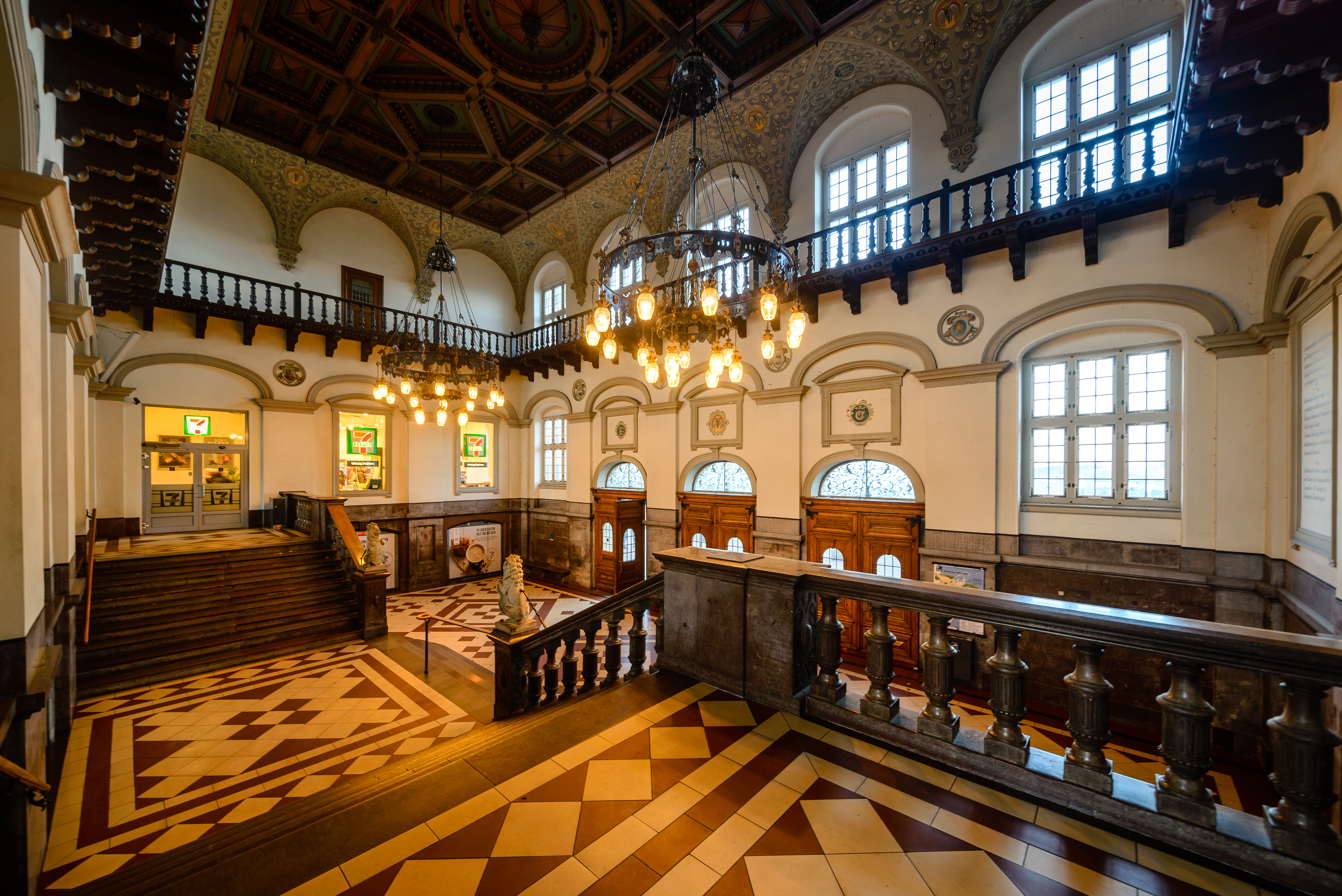
Main lobby

Formerly located on a sea bed, this station building rests on 1,600 poles embedded into the ground. It was designed by architect Niels Peder Christian Holsøe in collaboration with Heinrich Wenck in a Neo-Renaissance style locally known as Rosenborg Style after Rosenborg Castle in Copenhagen. It imitates Christian IV's Dutch Renaissance-style buildings from the first half of the 17th century and is characterized by red brickwork combined with sandstone ornamentation Dutch gables and an abundance of turrets with copper-clad spires.

The main entrance is flanked by marble columns. The room facing the sea, which now houses a restaurant, originally served as private chambers for the royal family.

In 1984, DSB embarked on a comprehensive restoration of the station building. It included new tiles in the original patterns on floors and exposure and restoration of the original decorations on walls and ceilings. The work was completed in 1987, and the main building including the platform roofs was listed in 1990.

In 1991, a new terminal building for the Helsingør ferry terminal was inaugurated adjacent to the old station building from 1891. The ferry terminal is decorated by the Danish artist Bjørn Nørgaard.

== Station facilities ==
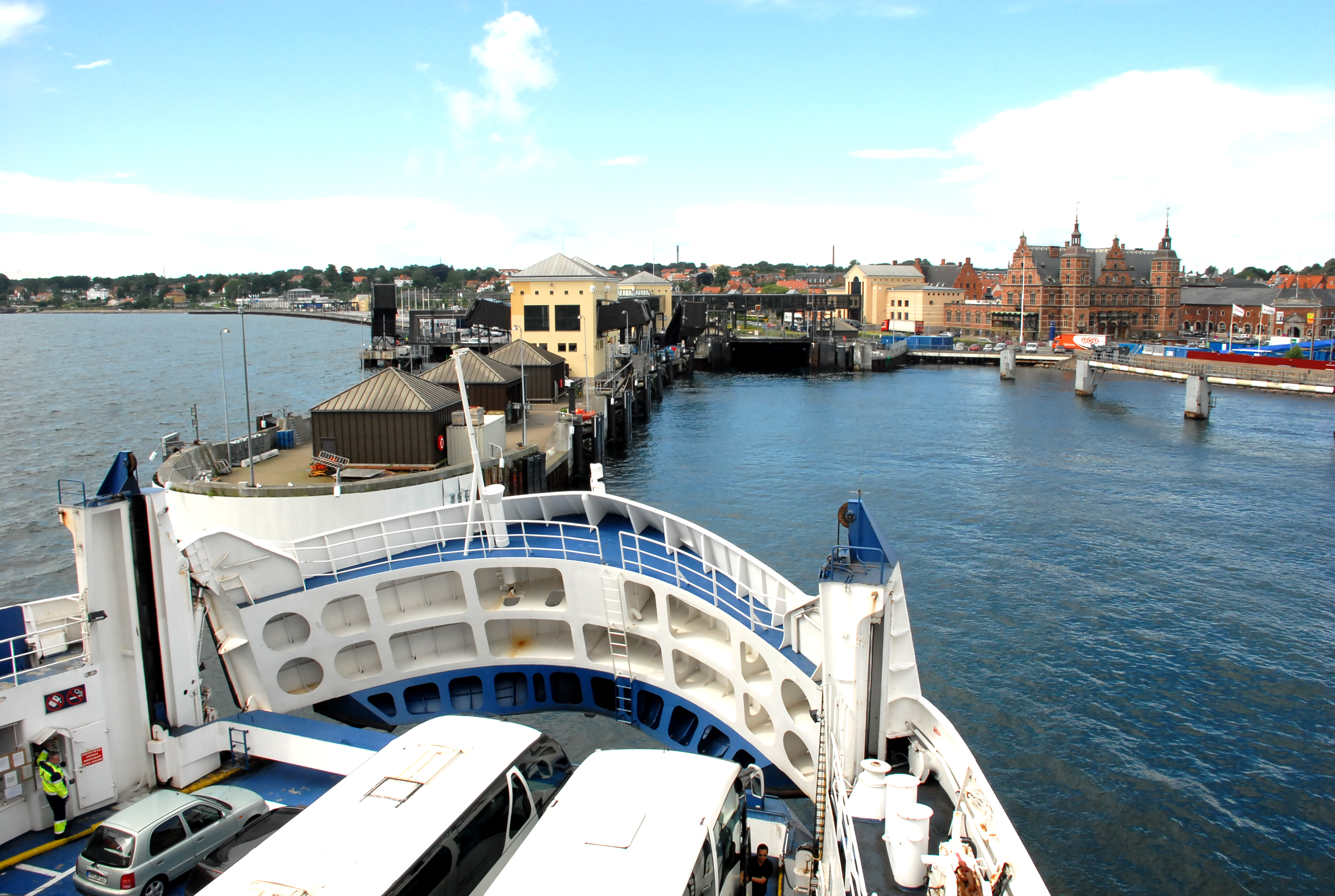
Ferry approaching the Helsingør ferry terminal (left) and Helsingør railway station (right).

Inside the station building there is a combined ticket office and convenience store operated by 7-Eleven, automated ticket machines, waiting room, toilets and lockers.

Adjacent to the station are the Helsingør ferry terminal and the Helsingør bus terminal. The station also has a bicycle parking station as well as a car park with approximately 140 parking spaces. The station forecourt has a taxi stand and also offers access to the Sundbusserne pedestrian and bicycle passenger ferry route to Helsingborg.

== Cultural references ==
Helsingør station is used as a location in the 1955 Danish film Det var paa Rundetaarn, the 1972 Danish film Lenin, You Rascal, You, and the 2022 Danish film The Kiss. It has also been used as a location in the TVW television series Sommerdahl.

== See also ==
- Transportation in Denmark
- Rail transport in Denmark
- History of rail transport in Denmark
- List of railway stations in Denmark
- Danish State Railways
- Banedanmark
