= Helsingør Municipality =

Helsingør Municipality Helsingør Kommune (Danish) Elsinore Municipality
- Municipality
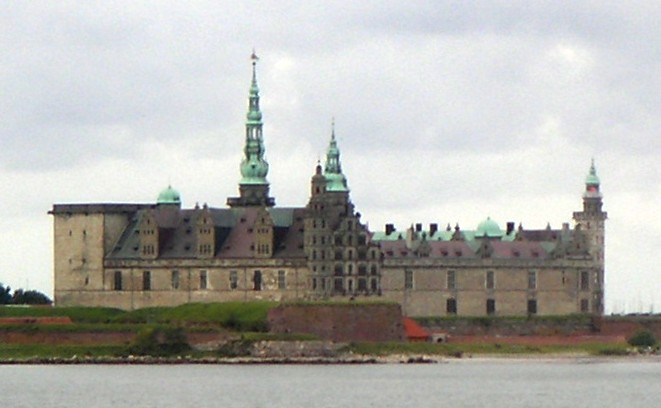
- Kronborg Castle in Helsingør Kommune

- Coat of arms

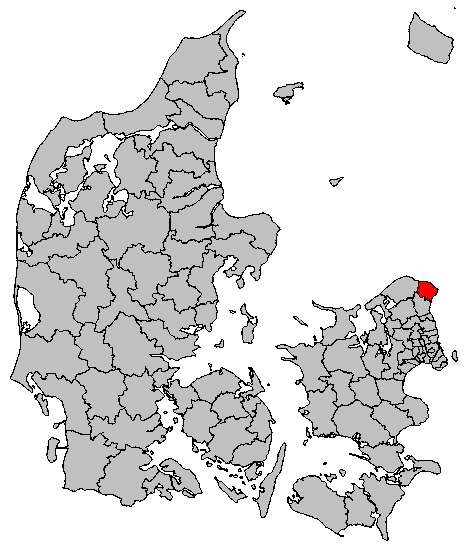
- Location in Denmark
- Coordinates: 56°02′05″N 12°36′40″E
- Country: Denmark
- Region: Hovedstaden
- Established: 1 April 1970

Government
  - Mayor: Benedikte Kiær

Area
  - Total: 121.6 km^{2} (47.0 sq mi)

Population (1 January 2026)
  - Total: 64,244
  - Density: 528.3/km^{2} (1,368/sq mi)
- Time zone: UTC+1 (CET)
  - Summer (DST): UTC+2 (CEST)
- Postal code: 3000
- Website: www.helsingor.dk

Helsingør Municipality (a variant English name: Elsinore Municipality; Danish: Helsingør Kommune) is a municipality in the Capital Region on the northeast coast of the island of Zealand (Sjælland) in eastern Denmark. The municipality covers an area of 121.6 km^{2}, and has a total population of 64,244 (1 January 2026). Its mayor as of 1 January 2014 is Benedikte Kiær, a member of the Conservative political party.

== Locations ==
The main town and the site of its municipal council is the town of Helsingør.

Helsingør	47,000
Hellebæk	5,400
Hornbæk	3,600
Saunte	1,200
Kvistgård	1,100
Tikøb	710
Gurre	400
Langesø	290

Other towns and villages include

- Ålsgårde
- Espergærde
- Mørdrup
- Skotterup
- Snekkersten
- Stenstrup

To the east is the Øresund, the strait which separates Zealand from Sweden. To the north is the Kattegat.

Ferry service connects the municipality at the town of Helsingør east over the Øresund to the town of Helsingborg, Sweden. The European routes E47 and E55 traverse the two cities.

Helsingør municipality was not merged with other municipalities due to the nationwide Kommunalreformen ("The Municipality Reform" of 2007).

== History ==
The town as we know it today was founded in the 1420s by the Danish king Eric of Pomerania. He established the Sound Dues in 1429 and built the castle 'Krogen', which was made bigger in the 1580s and named Kronborg. Kronborg Castle, known internationally as the setting of William Shakespeare's theatre play Hamlet, is today the town's main tourist attraction.

== Politics ==
=== Municipal council ===
Helsingør's municipal council consists of 25 members, elected every four years.

Below are the municipal councils elected since the Municipal Reform of 2007.

Election	Party								Total seats	Turnout	Elected mayor
Election	A	B	C	F	L	O	V	Ø	Total seats	Turnout	Elected mayor
2005	8	1	9	2		1	3	1	25	66.0%	Per Tærsbøl (C)
2009	7		8	4	1	2	2	1	25	67.4%	Johannes Hect-Nielsen (V)
2013	6	1	9	1	1	3	2	2	25	73.8%	Benedikte Kiær (C)
2017	8	1	9	1	1	2	1	2	25	72.0%	Benedikte Kiær (C)
Data from Kmdvalg.dk 2005, 2009, 2013 and 2017

== Economy ==
Local companies include the Noa Noa clothing company, Barslund, Bavarian Nordic and Peter Beier Chokolade.

== Twin towns – sister cities ==
Helsingør is twinned with:

- Harstad, Norway
- Rueil-Malmaison, France
- Sanremo, Italy
- Umeå, Sweden
- Uummannaq, Greenland
- Vaasa, Finland

== See also ==
- List of protected areas of Helsingør Municipality
