= Gilleleje railway station =

Railway station in Gilleleje, Denmark

Gilleleje
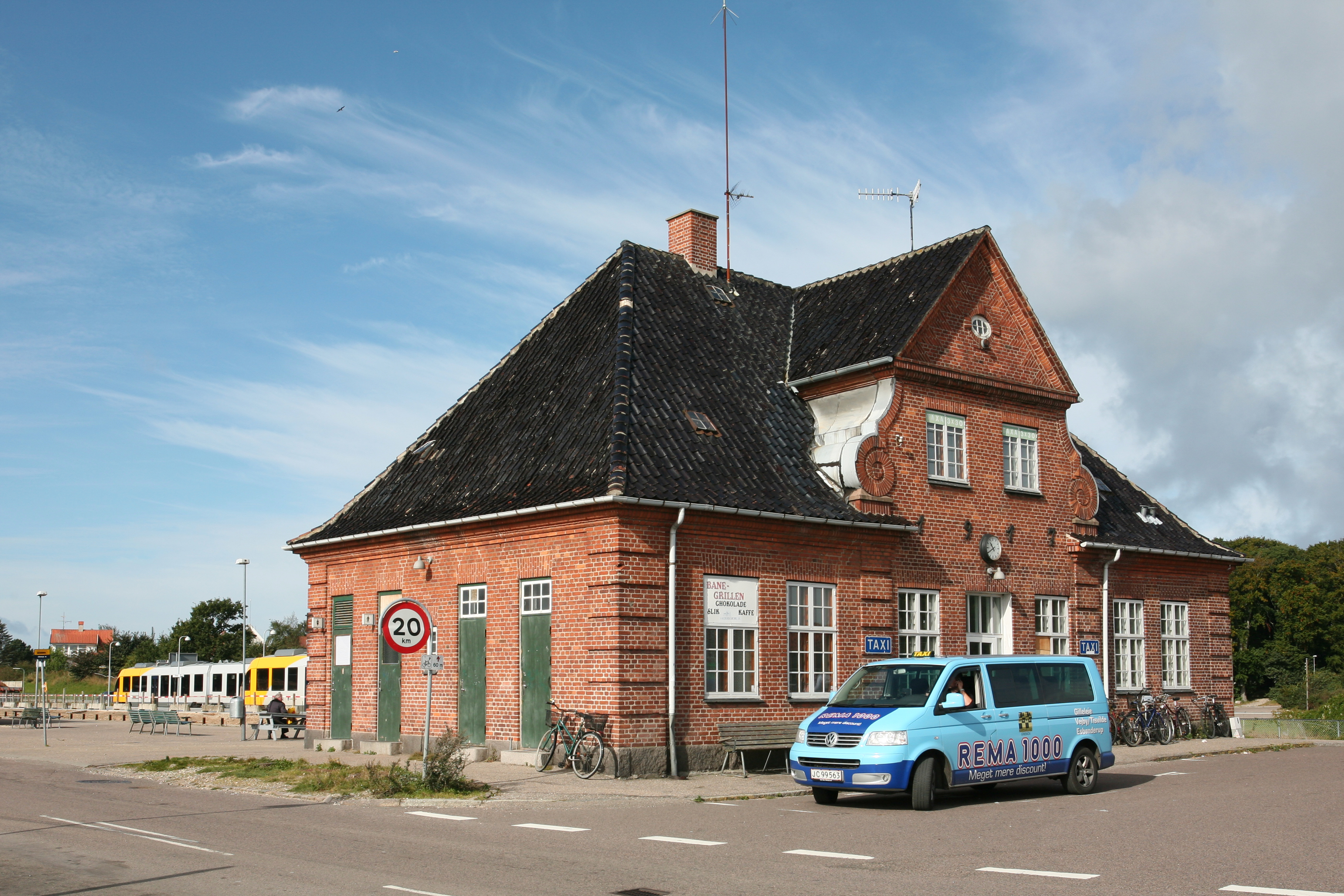
- Front facade of Gilleleje station

General information
- Location: Gilleleje Stationsvej 10; 3250 Gilleleje; Gribskov Municipality; Denmark
- Coordinates: 56°07′25″N 12°18′11″E
- Elevation: 8.5 metres (28 ft)
- Owner: Hovedstadens Lokalbaner
- Operator: Lokaltog
- Lines: Gribskov Line (since 1896); Hornbæk Line (since 1918)
- Platforms: 2
- Tracks: 3

Construction
- Architect: Heinrich Wenck

History
- Opened: 14 May 1896
- Rebuilt: 16 January 1918

Services
Preceding station	Lokaltog	Following station
Gilleleje East towards Helsingør	Hornbæk Line Local train	Terminus
Terminus	Gribskov Line Gilleleje branch	Fjellenstrup towards Hillerød
Location

Gilleleje station (Danish pronunciation: [kiləˈlɑjə stæˈɕoˀn]) is the main railway station serving the fishing town and seaside resort of Gilleleje on the north coast of the island of Zealand, Denmark.

The station is the terminus of the Hornbæk Line from Helsingør to Gilleleje and of the Gilleleje branch of the Gribskov Line from Hillerød to Gilleje. The train services are currently operated by the railway company Lokaltog which runs frequent local train services from Gilleleje to Helsingør station and Hillerød station with onward connections from there to the rest of Denmark.

The station opened in 1896, and its second and current station building designed by the architect Heinrich Wenck was inaugurated in 1918.

== History ==
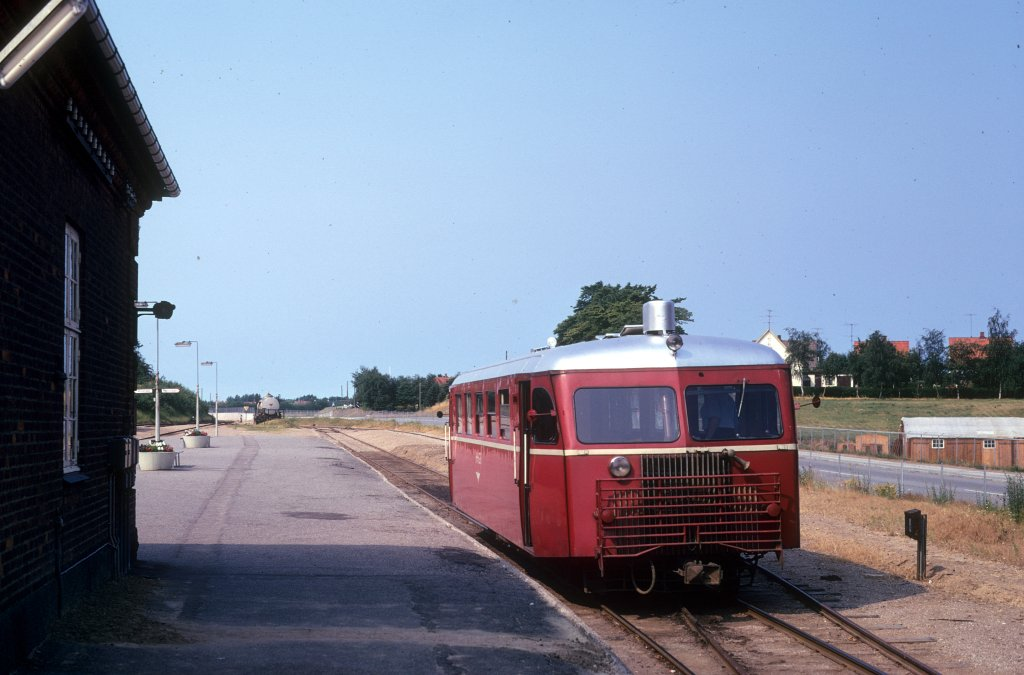
Railbus from the Hornbæk Line at Gilleleje station in July 1973.

The station opened in 1896 with the opening of the Græsted-Gilleleje section of the Gribskov railway line and served as the northern terminus of the branch line from Hillerød to Gilleleje.

In 1916, Gilleleje was also connected with Elsinore as the Hornbæk-Gilleleje section of the Hornbæk railway line was opened. However, from the opening in 1916, the railway halt Østerport served as the terminus of the Hornbæk Railway Line in Gilleleje, as it was not possible to reach an agreement with the Gribskov Line about a joint station in Gilleleje. On 16 January 1918, however, the new Gilleleje station serving both railway lines was inaugurated. In connection with this, the station was moved a short distance to the west, and a new and larger station building was constructed. The original station building initially remained standing but was demolished in 1961.

Until 1959 an industrial track connected Gilleleje station with Gilleleje harbour.

== Architecture ==
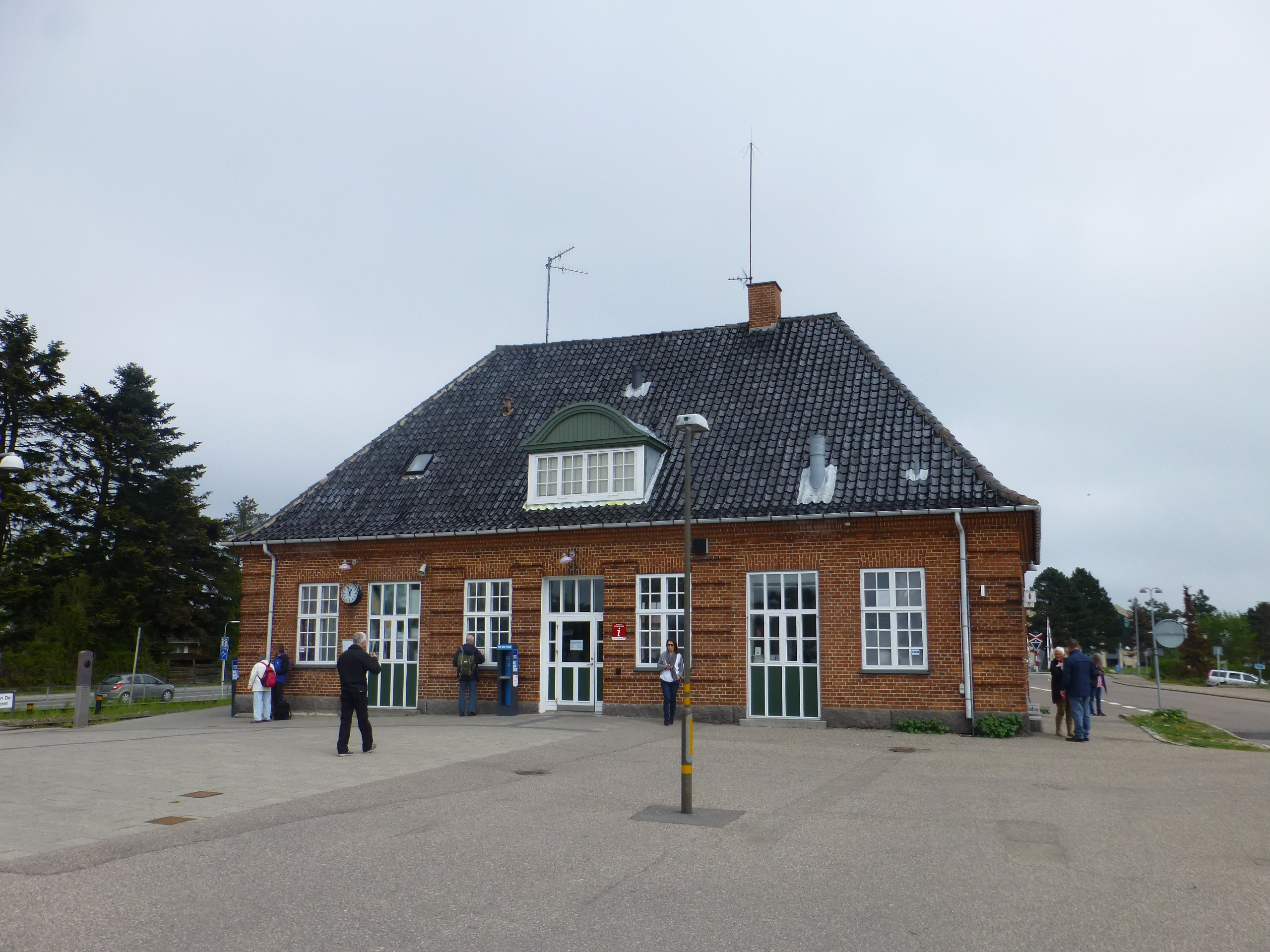
Platform facade of the station building in 2015.

Gilleleje station's second and current station building from 1918 was designed by the Danish architect Heinrich Wenck, known for the numerous railway stations he designed across Denmark in his capacity of head architect of the Danish State Railways from 1894 to 1921.

== Facilities ==
The station building contains ticket sales, a waiting room and toilets.

== Operations ==
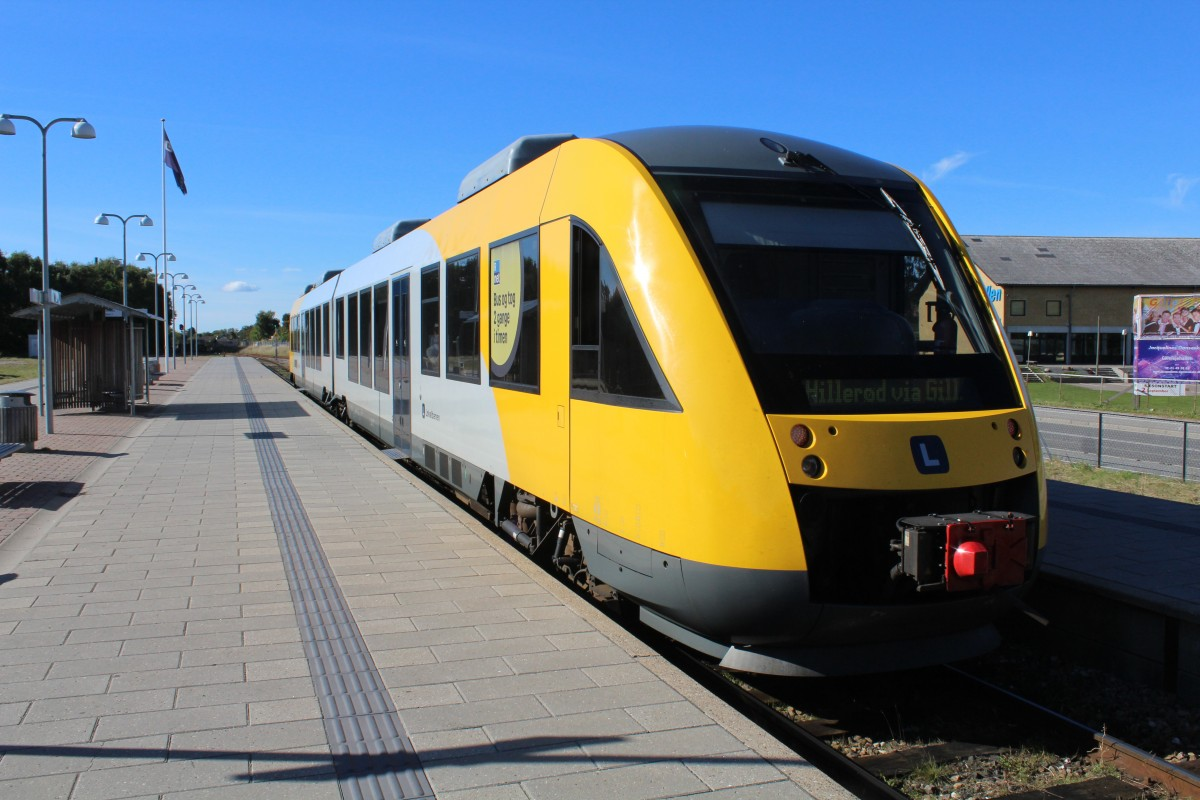
LINT 41 railcar to Hillerød calling at Gilleleje station in September 2013.

Since 2015, the train services from the station are operated by the regional railway company Lokaltog A/S which operates in the Capital Region and Region Zealand.

Lokaltog runs frequent local train services from Gilleleje station to Helsingør station and Hillerød station with onward connections from there to the rest of Denmark. There is continuous operation, such that the trains from one railway line continue along the other and vice versa.

== See also ==
- List of railway stations in Denmark
- Rail transport in Denmark
