= Gilleleje =

- Town
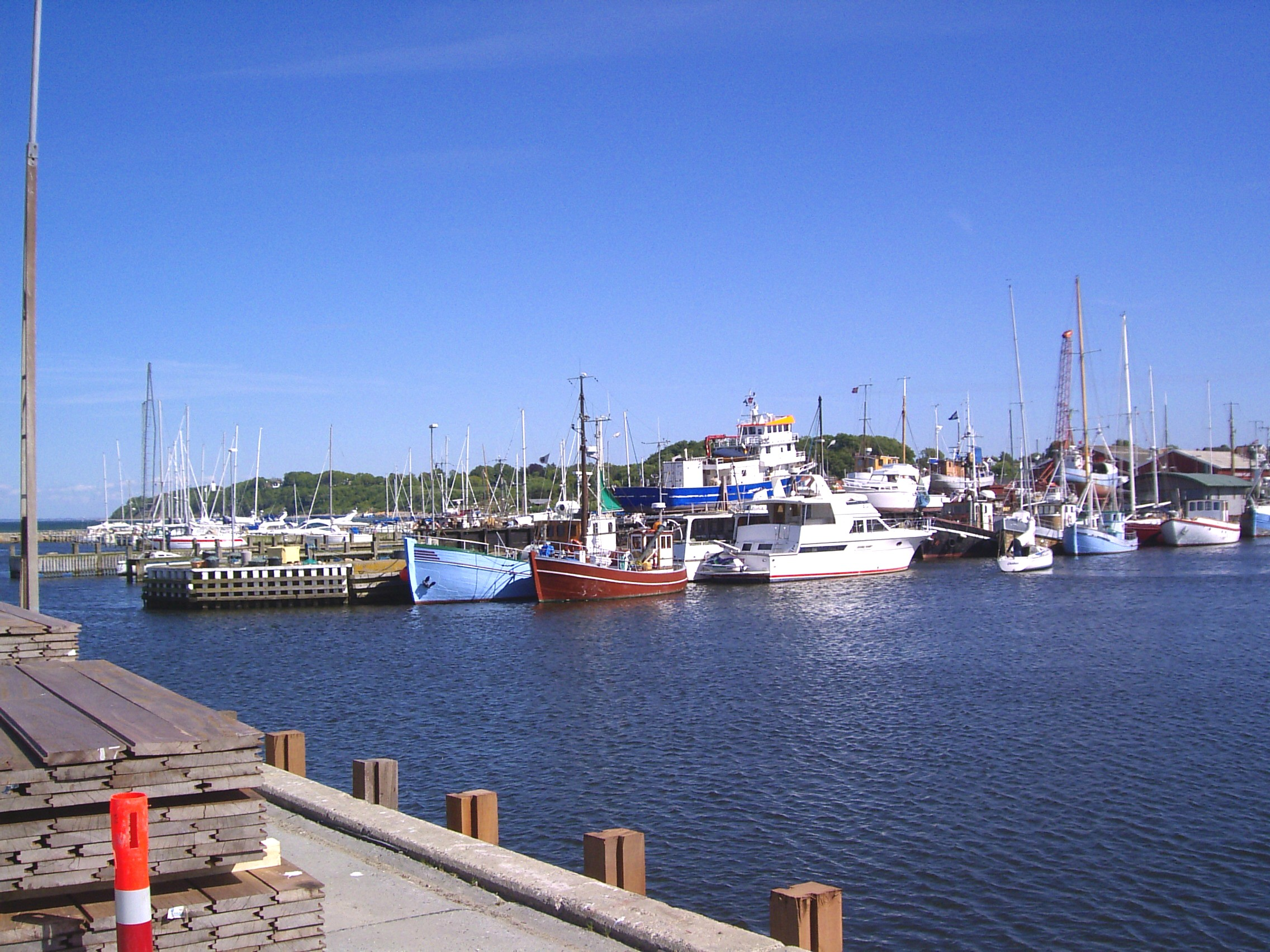
- Boats in the Gilleleje inner harbour

- Location in Denmark Gilleleje (Capital Region)
- Coordinates: 56°07′N 12°19′E
- Country: Denmark
- Region: Capital (Hovedstaden)
- Municipality: Gribskov

Area
  - Urban: 5.4 km^{2} (2.1 sq mi)

Population (2026)
  - Urban: 6,598
  - Urban density: 1,200/km^{2} (3,200/sq mi)
  - Gender: 3,087 males and 3,511 females
- Time zone: UTC+1 (CET)
  - Summer (DST): UTC+2 (CEST)
- Postal code: DK-3250 Gilleleje

Gilleleje (Danish pronunciation: [kiləˈlɑjə]) is a fishing town and seaside resort on the north coast of the peninsula North Zealand, Denmark. The town is located at the northernmost point of the island of Zealand. It is one of the main towns of the Gribskov municipality in Region Hovedstaden in Denmark. As of 1 January 2026, it has a population of 6,598.

== Etymology ==
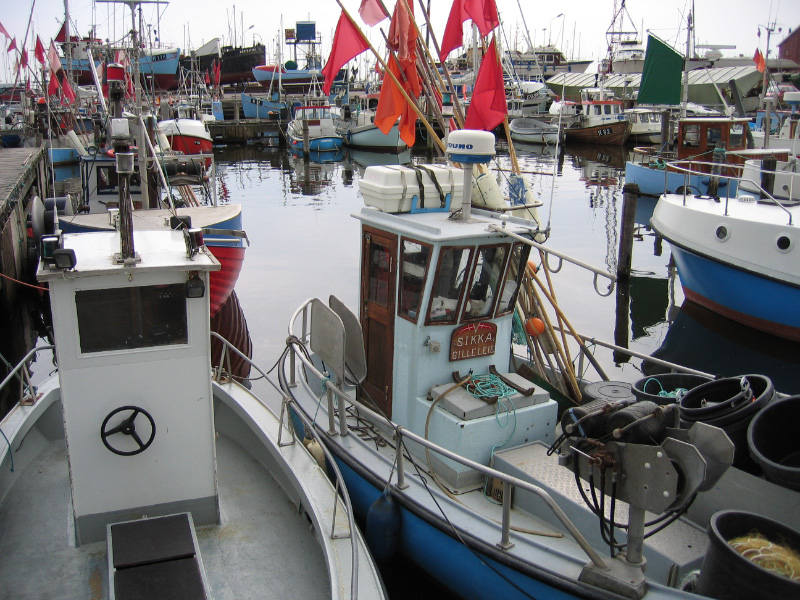
Fishing boats in Gilleleje harbor

The name Gilleleje is a combination of the archaic Danish word gil, which is a crevice or cleft, and leje, which is a place where fishermen come in specific seasons to fish. It was probably shortened from Gilbjerg Leje, where Gilbjerg ("cleftmountain") is a rather dramatic name for a rather mundane point just west of town limits. The Danish villages ending in -leje are often from the 16th century, when seasonal fishermen began settling and regular townships appeared. Compare with the Swedish ending läge.

== History ==
=== Fishing village ===
The earliest confirmed permanent residence in Gilleleje is in the early 16th century. An excavation, done in 1979 by the city museum, revealed a lot from a house under the layers of sand. The house had most likely been built shortly after 1536, as a coin was found, dated 1534–36. There were also found ceramics reminiscent of other finds, so the archeologists assumed that the culture layer was from the late 15th century. Additionally, the house was found on the address Fabersvej 10 which is not the closest to the beach, and the habit was to build from the beach and inwards.

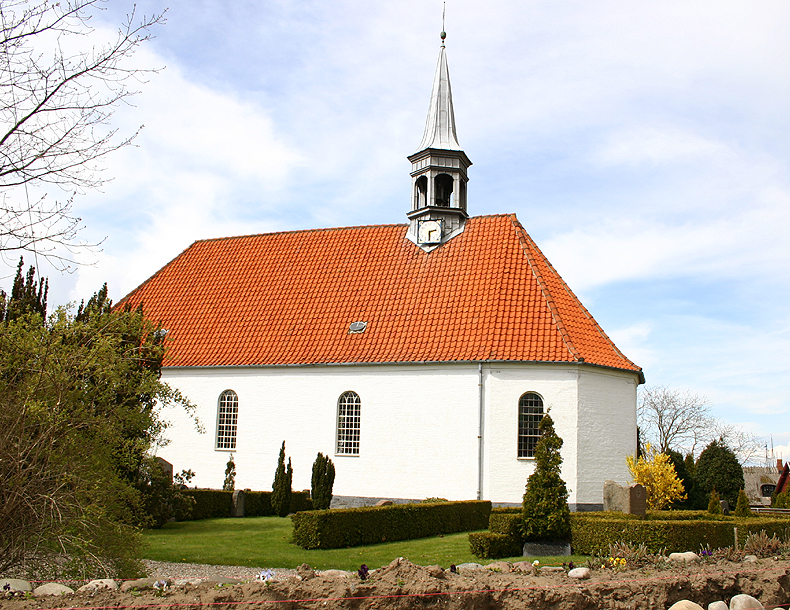
Gilleleje church was inaugurated in 1538.

At around this time, it is also known that the village had enough financial means to build a church and hire a priest. This required considerable funds, and the general consensus, then, is that the township went from seasonal fishing to year-round fishing, and the fishermen settled down in the years surrounding 1500. Town hall has established 1488 as the "official" founding year to make celebrating easier. The church was inaugurated in 1538 by the newly ordained priest Hans Lauridtzen.

In 1588, the vassal of Kronborg made a list of the taxes that the fishermen should pay. This was one or a half barrel of cod. From this list, we can see who the earliest citizens were. There are about 70 names (a name is analogous to a house - there were probably about 500 citizens), with the surnames Lauritsen, Rasmussen, Jensen and Skomager being the most common. Note that patronymic surnames were the norm then, but from this, it gives an impression of what first names were in vogue among the citizens.

Aside from the fishing, the taxes allowed people to grow various types of crops south of the town, such as wheat. There was also a pasture, on which there were many cows and sheep. Most of the town was on the eastern side of the stream that came from Søborg ("Lakecastle" - ironically, the lake has since been drained and the castle is now a ruin) in the south and went out in the ocean just east of the drying grounds.

Unfortunately, the influx of fishermen made hard on the fishing, and several families could not catch enough fish to both sustain a living and pay the taxes. In 1632, only 18 families were left. This stabilized the conditions somewhat, and in 1682, the number was up to 30, according to the records of Christian V. A new problem was present, though. The shifting sand would bury boats and nets, and had to be shoveled away, delaying the real work somewhat. Part of the eastern side of the town was even deserted as a few houses had gradually been buried under dunes.

South of the town was Nellerupgård, the local manor, home to Carl Christian Lembach and Catrine Marie Milan (a descendant of Gabriel Milan) in the late 18th century. They owned most of the land in the area, especially after extracting "their" parts of the common pasture, letting the common citizens get the furthermost areas.

=== Fishing town and seaside resort ===
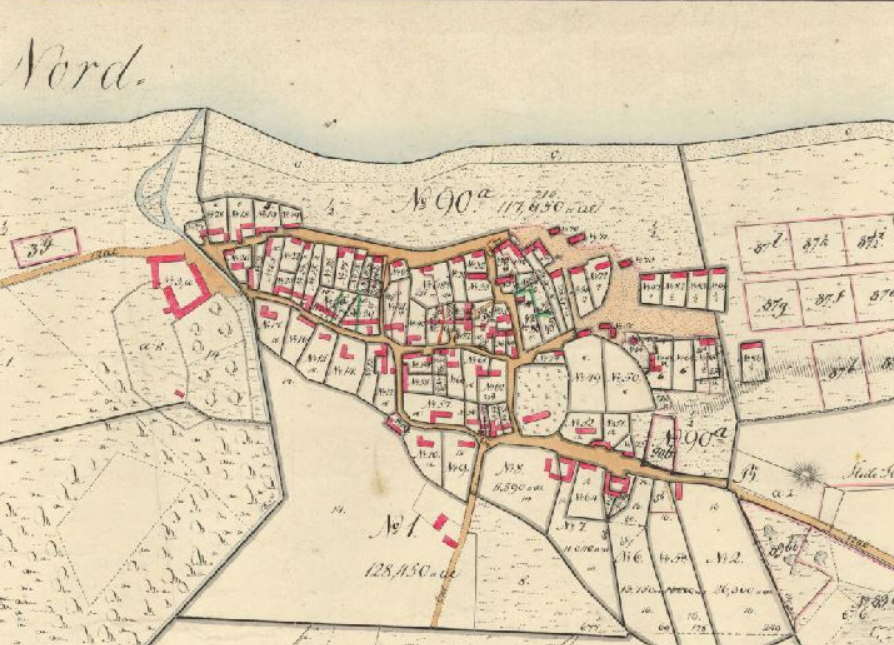
Map of Gilleleje in 1860.

During the 1810s and 20s, the city expanded a lot, and many new houses were built in the eastern area that had once been abandoned. A real harbor was built in 1873, where the drying ground had been. This meant larger ships and thus more jobs, making more people move to the town. In 1890, the town was at 865 households, 112 of which were fishermen. In 1896, Gilleleje was connected with the Danish rail network as the Græsted–Gilleleje section of the Gribskov railway line between Hillerød and Gilleleje opened. The outer harbor was finished in 1902, and in 1916 Gilleleje was connected with Elsinore as the Hornbæk-Gilleleje section of the Hornbæk railway line was opened.

At the same time, Gilleleje developed into a seaside resort that attracted a large number of holidaymakers every year. At the turn of the century, the town thus contained a guest house, a bathing hotel, many villas, a sanatorium and recreation homes.

=== World War II ===
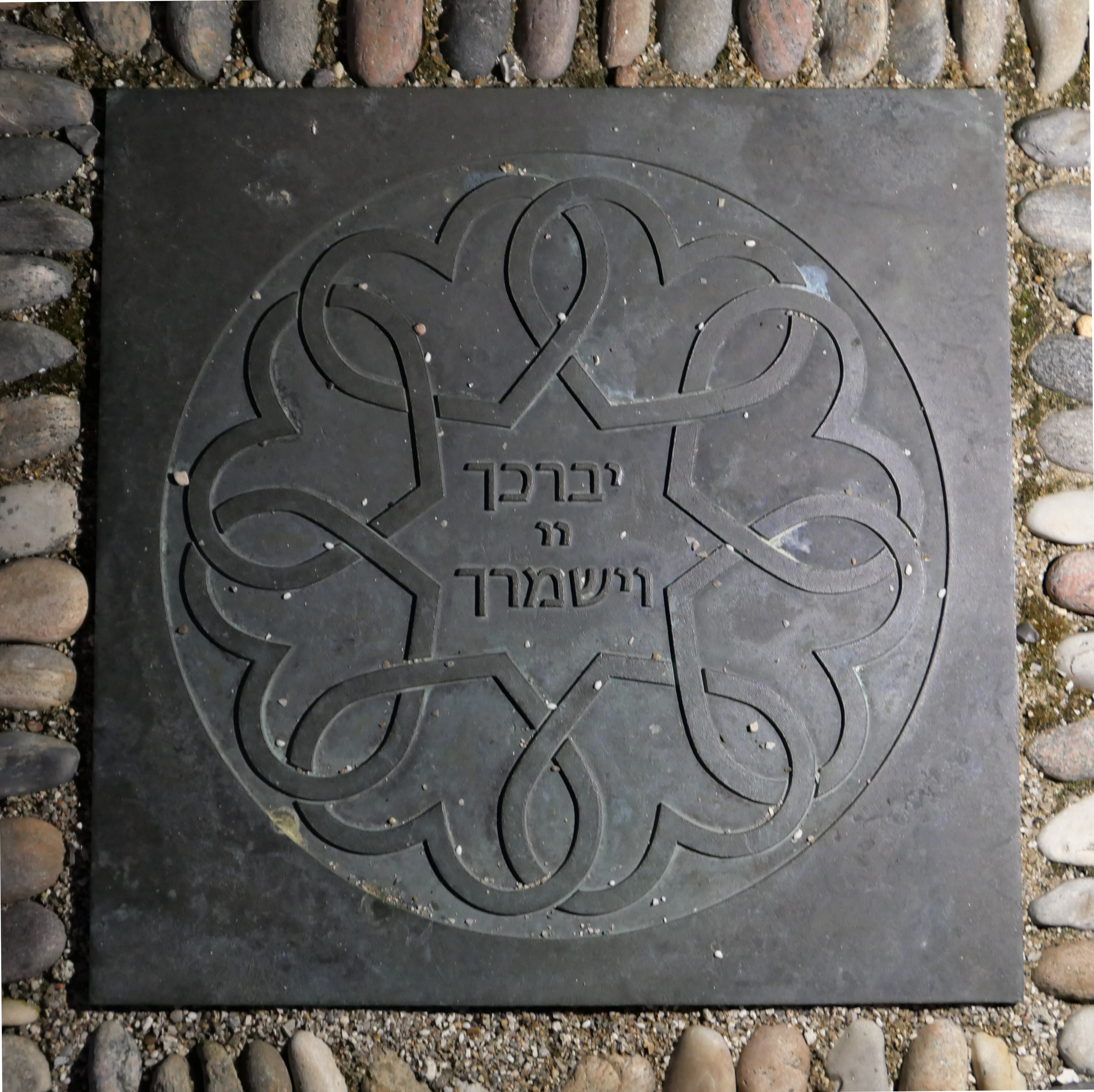
Commemorative tile, designed by Danish artist Gerda Thune Andersen, on the floor at the entrance to the church. The Hebrew inscription is a quote from the book of Numbers (6, 24–26): "יברכך ה' וישמרך" ("The LORD bless you and take care of you")

Gilleleje continued to thrive on its fishing until 1940 when Nazi-Germany occupied Denmark. Like most other Danes at the time, the Gillelejere were against the oppression and helped the Jews by hiding them various places in the town. However, on 2 October 1943, the Gestapo set out to capture all Danish Jews. The Jews in Gilleleje were hidden in the church-loft, and the fishermen prepared for taking them across the sound to Sweden in their cutters. They could not leave immediately, though, because of the German patrols in the street. After several days of hiding, an informer let the Germans know where the roughly 75 Jews were hiding, and they were all captured, bar a single boy who hid behind a gravestone in the cemetery. According to local lore, the priest was so mortified by the situation that he never really became normal again.

A memorable exchange resulted after the Gestapo seized Jewish families in the town. "The poor Jews!" exclaimed one villager to a Gestapo officer. When the German responded that it was "written in the Bible that this shall be their fate,” the villager retorted, “but it is not written that it has to happen in Gilleleje.”

After the occupation was over, several memorials have been put up in the town, both commemorating the Jews and the fishermen who lost their lives when colliding with sea mines.

=== Post-war period ===
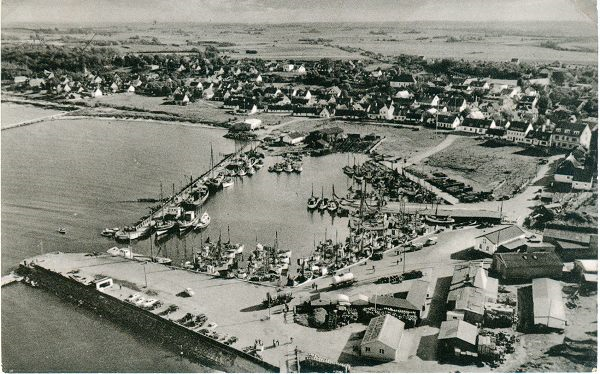
Aerial photo of Gilleleje before 1950.

The eastern areas (called Stæremosen - "Starling moor") that had been used for pasture became the industrial area in and around 1950, creating more jobs, meaning more newcomers.

== Economy ==
Gilleleje harbor is the 5th largest commercial fishing harbor in Denmark.

== Infrastructure ==
=== Transportation ===
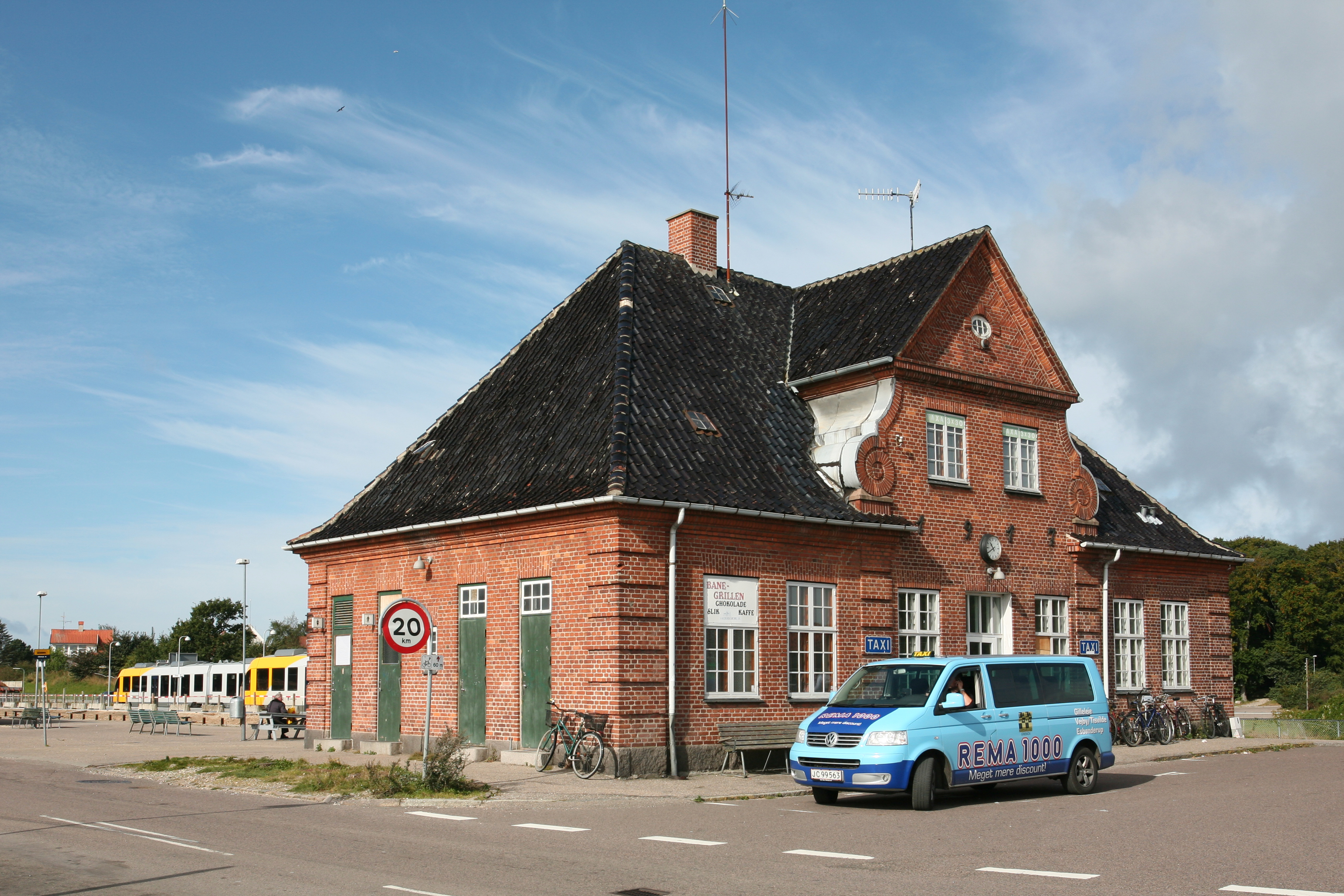
Gilleleje railway station.

The Hornbæk railway line connects Gilleleje with Helsingør and the Gribskov railway line connects Gilleleje with Hillerød. Gilleleje railway station is the principal railway station of the town. The town is also served by the railway halts Gilleleje East, Stæremosen and Fjellenstrup.

== Notable people ==
- Dina Birte Al-Erhayem (1975–2019), actress with an Iraqi background, raised in Gilleleje
- Mikkel Boe Følsgaard (born 1984), actor, raised in Gilleleje
- Holger Jacobsen (1876–1960), architect, designed his own summer house in Gilleleje in 1919
- Christine Milton (born 1985), pop singer, songwriter and professional dancer, raised in Gilleleje

== Bibliography ==
- Johannes Steenstrup, De Danske Stednavne (1918)
- Palle Lauring, Her Skete Det 1: Sjælland (1969)
- Various authors, Gilleleje: 1488 - 1988 (1988)

== See also ==
- Rågeleje
