= Hovedstadens Lokalbaner =

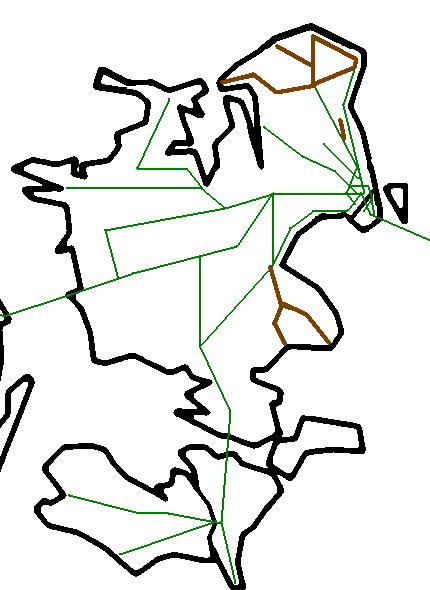
2006 map of the railway lines on Zealand with the Hovedstadens Lokalbaner in brown

Hovedstadens Lokalbaner (Danish pronunciation: [ˈhoːð̩ˌstæðn̩s loˈkɛˀlˌpɛːnɐ]) is a Danish company formed in 2002 that owns the trains and tracks of several local railways around Copenhagen: Frederiksværkbanen, Gribskovbanen, Hornbækbanen, Lille Nord, Nærumbanen and Østbanen. It leases trains and trackage rights to the operating companies DSB S-tog (for Lille Nord) and Lokalbanen (all other lines).

== See also ==
- Lokalbanen
