= Kagerup railway station =

Railway station in North Zealand, Denmark

Kagerup
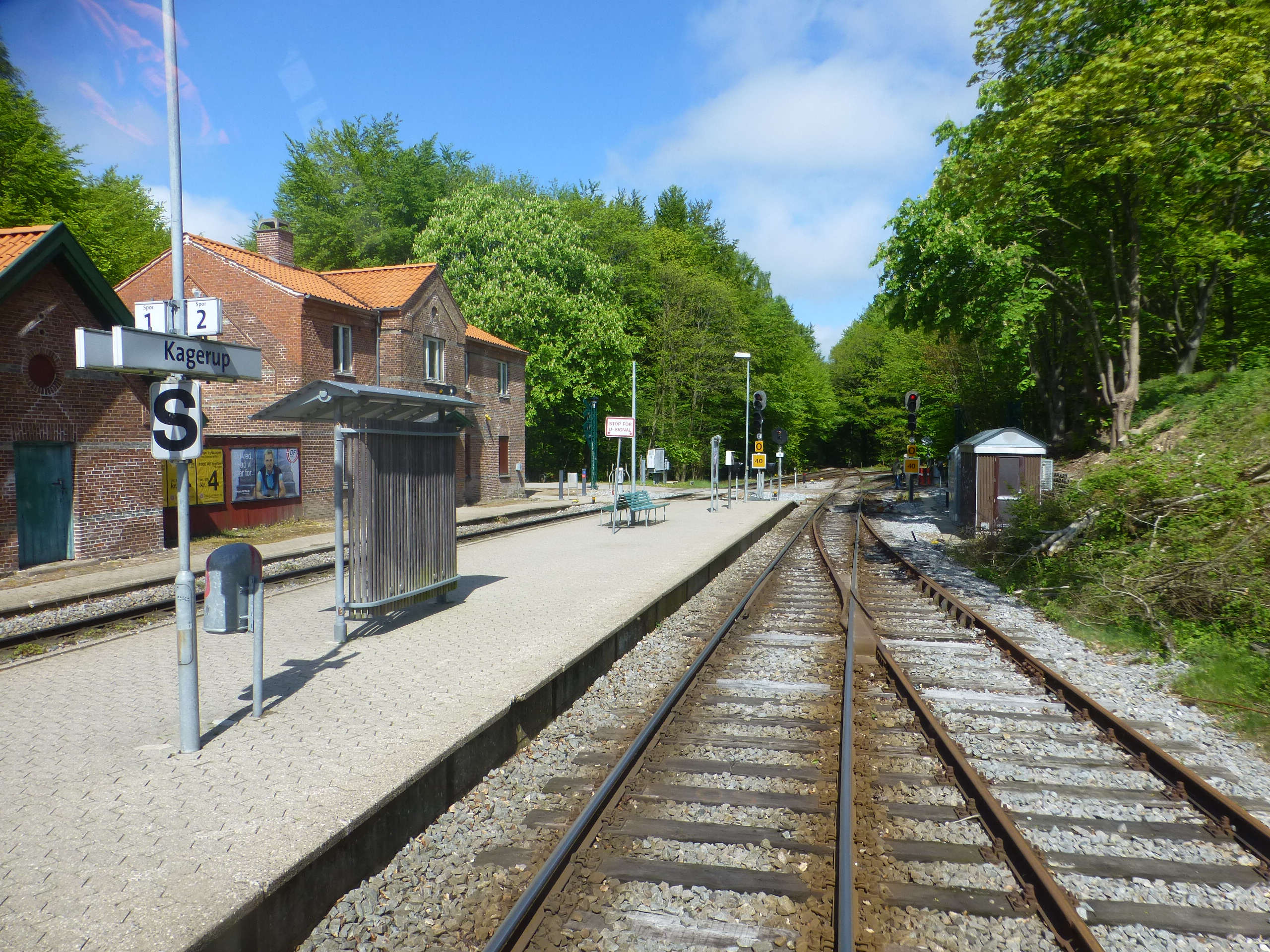
- Kagerup railway station in 2015

General information
- Location: Kagerup Stationsvej 58; Kagerup, 3200 Helsinge; Gribskov Municipality; Denmark
- Coordinates: 55°59′51″N 12°17′9″E
- Elevation: 53.9 metres (177 ft)
- Owner: Hovedstadens Lokalbaner
- Operator: Lokaltog
- Line: Gribskov Line
- Platforms: 1
- Tracks: 2

History
- Opened: 20 January 1880

Services
Preceding station	Lokaltog	Following station
Duemose towards Tisvildeleje	Gribskov Line Tisvildeleje branch	Gribsø towards Hillerød
Mårum towards Gilleleje	Gribskov Line Gilleleje branch	Gribsø towards Hillerød
Location

Kagerup railway station is a railway junction located in the central part of the Gribskov forest, about 1 km (0.62 mi) west of the village of Kagerup in North Zealand, Denmark.

Kagerup railway station is located on the Gribskov Line. At Kagerup the railway line from Hillerød splits into two branches to the seaside resort towns of Tisvildeleje and Gilleleje. The train services are operated by the railway company Lokaltog which runs frequent local train services from Hillerød station to Tisvildeleje station and Gilleleje station.

== Cultural references ==
Kagerup station is used as a location in the 1972 Danish film Lenin, You Rascal, You, the 1976 Danish film Ghost Train International based on Arnold Ridley's 1923 play The Ghost Train, and the 1992 Danish film Krummerne 2 - Poor Krumme.

== See also ==
- List of railway stations in Denmark
- Rail transport in Denmark
