= 2021 Gribskov municipal election =

- 16 November 2021

All 23 seats to the Gribskov Municipal Council 12 seats needed for a majority
- Turnout: 23,340 (69.4%) ▼4.1pp
	First party	Second party	Third party
	C	V	E
Party	Conservatives	Venstre	Nytgribskov
Last election	2 seats, 6,7%	7 seats, 25.9%	6 seats, 21.4%
Seats won	6	5	4
Seat change	▲4	▼2	▼2
Popular vote	5,220	4,400	3,714
Percentage	22.8%	19.2%	16.2%
Swing	▲16.1%	▼6.7%	▼5.2%
	Fourth party	Fifth party	Sixth party
	A	F	D
Party	Social Democrats	Green Left	New Right
Last election	5 seats, 18.2%	0 seats, 3.2%	0 seats, 2.1%
Seats won	2	2	1
Seat change	▼3	▲2	▲1
Popular vote	2,759	1,901	1,469
Percentage	12.0%	8.3%	6.4%
Swing	▼6.2%	▲5.1%	▲4.3%
	Seventh party	Eighth party	Ninth party
	Ø	O	B
Party	Red–Green Alliance	Danish People's Party	Social Liberals
Last election	1 seat, 5.2%	2 seats, 9.0%	0 seats, 1.6%
Seats won	1	1	1
Seat change	0	▼1	▲1
Popular vote	1,225	1,023	797
Percentage	5.4%	4.5%	3.5%
Swing	▲0.2%	▼4.5%	▲1.9%
Mayor before election
Anders Gerner Frost
Nytgribskov
Mayor after election
Bent Hansen
Venstre

Prior to the 2017 election, only the Conservatives and Venstre had held the mayor's position in the municipality. (Note: counting from the 2007 municipal reform) However, in the 2017 election, local party Nytgribskov had managed to win the mayor's position after an agreement with the Social Democrats and the Red–Green Alliance.

In this election, Conservatives would become the largest party, the first time for the party in the municipality. (Note: from 2007) However, Bent Hansen from Venstre managed to get a majority supporting him as mayor. The agreement would be with the Social Democrats, the Social Liberals, Nytgribskov, the Green Left and Red–Green Alliance.

== Electoral system ==
For elections to Danish municipalities, a number varying from 9 to 31 are chosen to be elected to the municipal council. The seats are then allocated using the D'Hondt method and a closed list proportional representation. Gribskov Municipality had 23 seats in 2021

Unlike in Danish General Elections, in elections to municipal councils, electoral alliances are allowed.

== Electoral alliances ==
=== Electoral Alliance 1 ===
Party		Political alignment
C	Conservatives	Centre-right
D	New Right	Right-wing to Far-right
O	Danish People's Party	Right-wing to Far-right
V	Venstre	Centre-right

=== Electoral Alliance 2 ===
Party		Political alignment
B	Social Liberals	Centre to Centre-left
F	Green Left	Centre-left to Left-wing
Ø	Red–Green Alliance	Left-wing to Far-Left
Å	The Alternative	Centre-left to Left-wing

=== Electoral Alliance 3 ===
Party		Political alignment
E	nytgribskov	Local politics
M	Klimapartiet i Gribskov	Local politics
U	KultureltFokus	Local politics

== Results by polling station ==
M = Klimapartiet i Gribskov
U = KultureltFokus

Division	A	B	C	D	E	F	M	O	U	V	Ø
Division	%	%	%	%	%	%	%	%	%	%	%
Blistrup	12.4	2.4	20.6	7.5	14.2	7.8	0.2	6.2	0.7	22.9	4.6
Esbønderup	12.9	4.1	19.7	7.3	12.7	10.5	0.3	3.9	0.9	16.7	7.1
Valby	8.1	3.6	17.7	6.9	14.1	11.4	0.6	2.4	0.6	27.5	6.0
Græsted	12.9	3.8	19.0	8.0	12.1	8.1	0.2	5.0	1.0	24.4	5.2
Helsinge	14.3	2.4	20.8	5.2	21.0	8.0	0.0	5.0	0.4	18.5	4.0
Søborg	10.8	4.8	21.1	7.7	14.0	7.2	0.4	3.5	1.4	20.3	7.7
Gilleleje	10.5	5.2	35.0	5.3	9.2	6.8	0.3	3.7	1.9	15.6	6.1
Annisse	10.5	3.0	22.5	6.7	26.3	6.6	0.3	3.6	0.2	16.5	3.4
Mårum	8.1	6.0	18.9	6.0	16.9	7.2	0.3	6.7	0.2	22.4	6.4
Ramløse	9.4	2.6	21.1	7.3	15.9	7.7	0.3	3.8	0.2	27.7	3.7
Vejby	13.7	2.4	19.0	7.5	20.5	9.2	0.4	5.2	0.4	15.1	6.4
Tibirke	12.7	3.1	17.4	3.6	25.6	14.9	0.3	2.6	0.5	10.7	7.8

== Results ==
Party		Votes	%	+/-	Seats	+/-
Gribskov Municipality
C	Conservatives	5,220	22.78	+16.05	6	+4
V	Venstre	4,400	19.20	-6.74	5	-2
E	nytgribskov	3,714	16.21	-5.22	4	-2
A	Social Democrats	2,759	12.04	-6.19	2	-3
F	Green Left	1,901	8.30	+5.09	2	+2
D	New Right	1,469	6.41	+4.30	1	+1
Ø	Red-Green Alliance	1,225	5.35	+0.12	1	0
O	Danish People's Party	1,023	4.46	-4.49	1	-1
B	Social Liberals	797	3.48	+1.89	1	+1
U	KultureltFokus	187	0.82	New	0	New
Å	The Alternative	165	0.72	-2.55	0	0
M	Klimapartiet i Gribskov	54	0.24	New	0	New
Total		22,914	100	N/A	23	N/A
Invalid votes		72	0.21	-0.06		
Blank votes		354	1.05	+0.25		
Turnout		23,340	69.43	-4.12		
Source: valg.dk
