= Helsinge railway station =

Railway station in Helsinge, Denmark

Helsinge
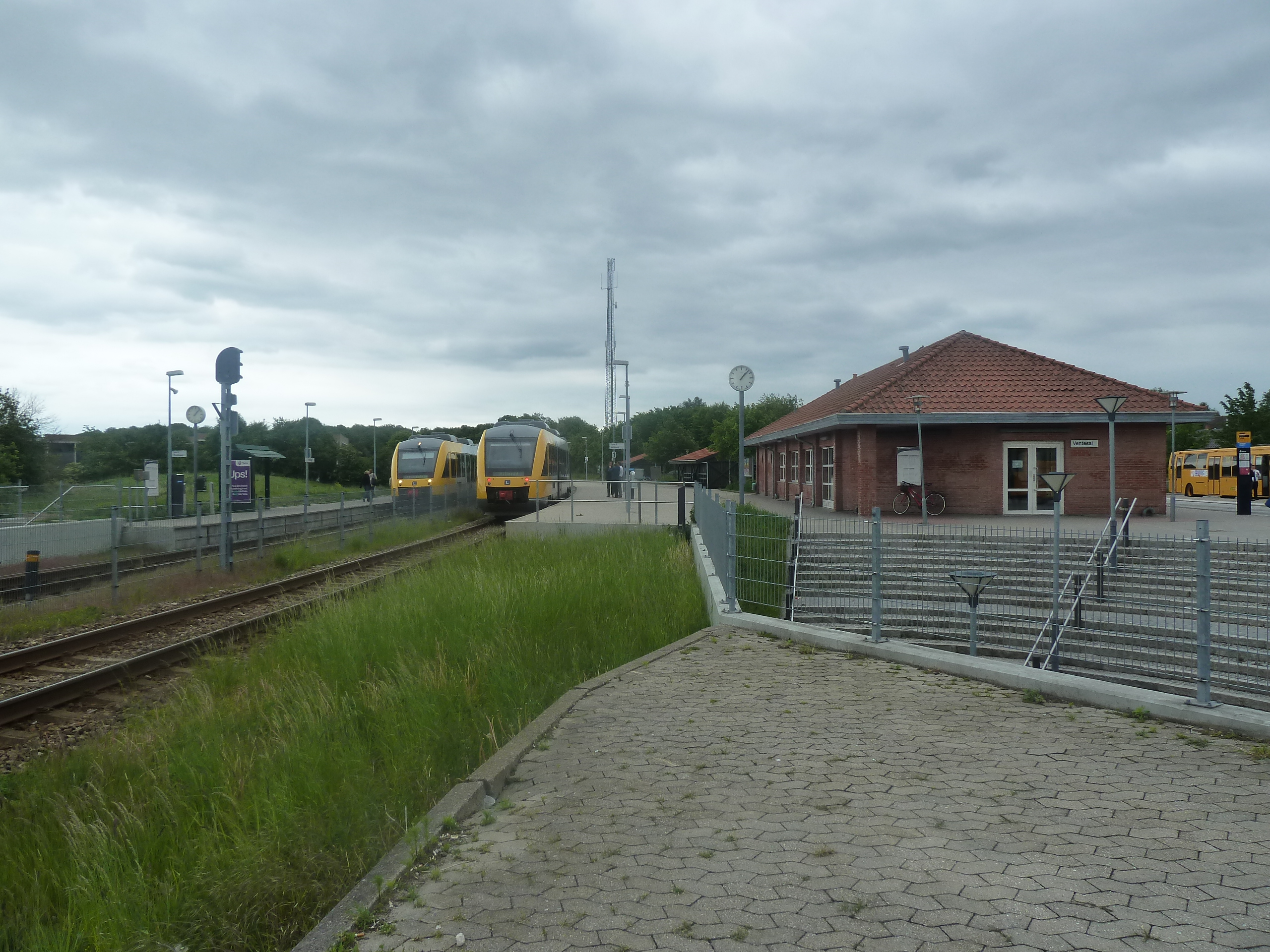
- Helsinge station in 2011

General information
- Location: Stationspladsen 1; 3200 Helsinge; Gribskov Municipality; Denmark
- Coordinates: 56°1′23″N 12°12′20″E
- Elevation: 24.7 metres (81 ft)
- Owner: Hovedstadens Lokalbaner
- Operator: Lokaltog
- Line: Gribskov Line
- Platforms: 2
- Tracks: 2

History
- Opened: 16 June 1897

Services
Preceding station	Lokaltog	Following station
Troldebakkerne towards Tisvildeleje	Gribskov Line Tisvildeleje branch	Duemose towards Hillerød
Location

Helsinge station is a railway station serving the town of Helsinge in North Zealand, Denmark.

Helsinge station is located on the Gribskov Line from Hillerød to Tisvildeleje. The station was opened in 1897 with the opening of the Kagerup-Helsinge section of the Gribskov Line. The train services are operated by the railway company Lokaltog which runs frequent local train services between Tisvildeleje station and Hillerød station.

== See also ==
- List of railway stations in Denmark
