= Mårum railway station =

Railway station in North Zealand, Denmark

Mårum
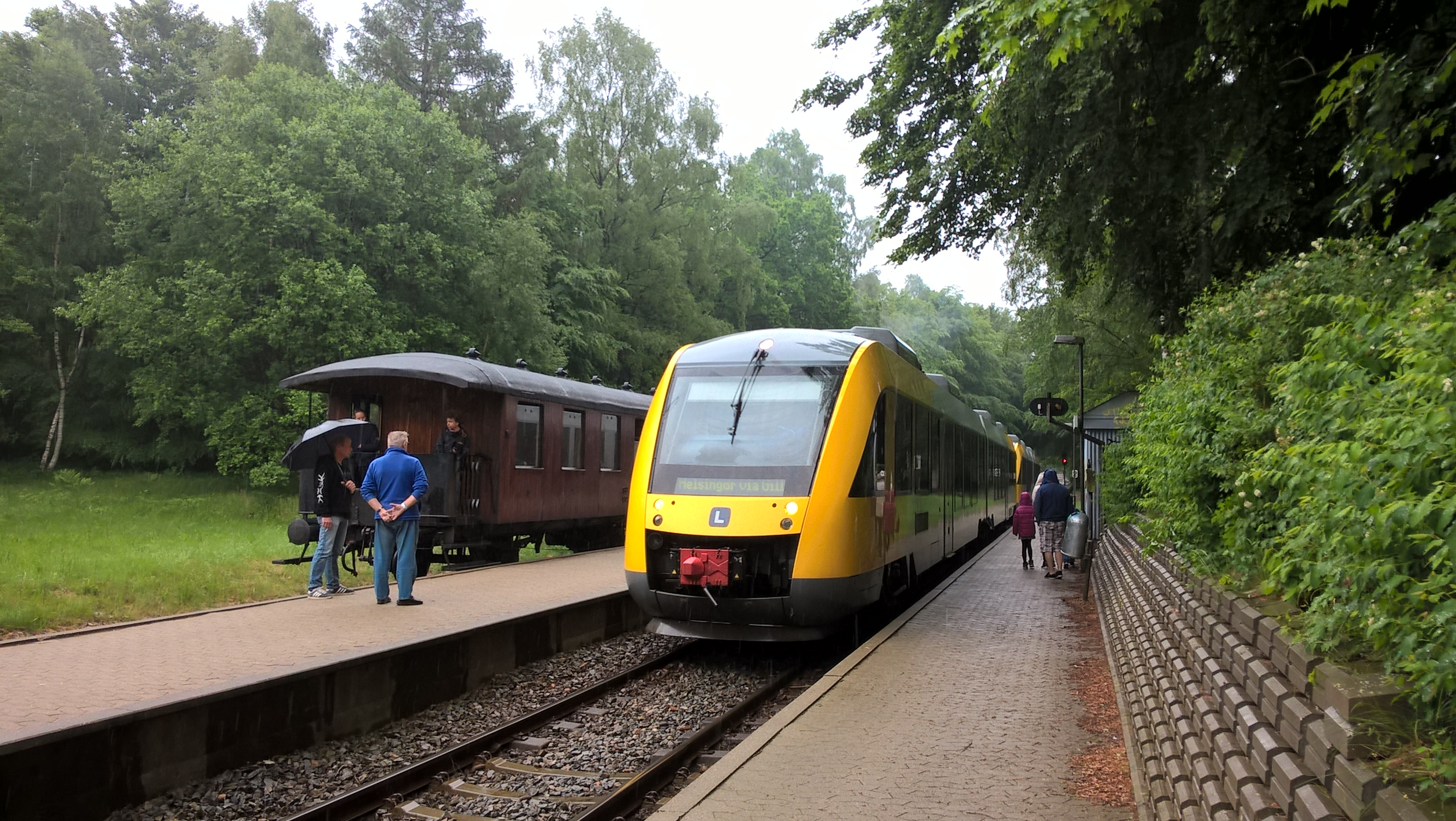
- Mårum railway station in 2017

General information
- Location: Frederiksværkvej 135, Mårum; 3230 Græsted; Gribskov Municipality; Denmark
- Coordinates: 56°01′50.45″N 12°19′1.06″E
- Elevation: 43.7 metres (143 ft)
- Owner: Hovedstadens Lokalbaner
- Operator: Lokaltog
- Line: Gribskov Line
- Platforms: 2
- Tracks: 2

Services
Preceding station	Lokaltog	Following station
Saltrup towards Gilleleje	Gribskov Line Gilleleje branch	Kagerup towards Hillerød
Location

Mårum railway station is a railway station located in the northern part of the Gribskov forest, about 2 km (1.2 mi) east of the village of Mårum in North Zealand, Denmark.

Mårum railway station is located on the Gribskov Line from Hillerød to Gilleleje. The train services are operated by the railway company Lokaltog which runs frequent local train services between Hillerød station and Gilleleje station.

== See also ==
- List of railway stations in Denmark
