= Godhavn railway halt =

Railway halt in North Zealand, Denmark

Godhavn
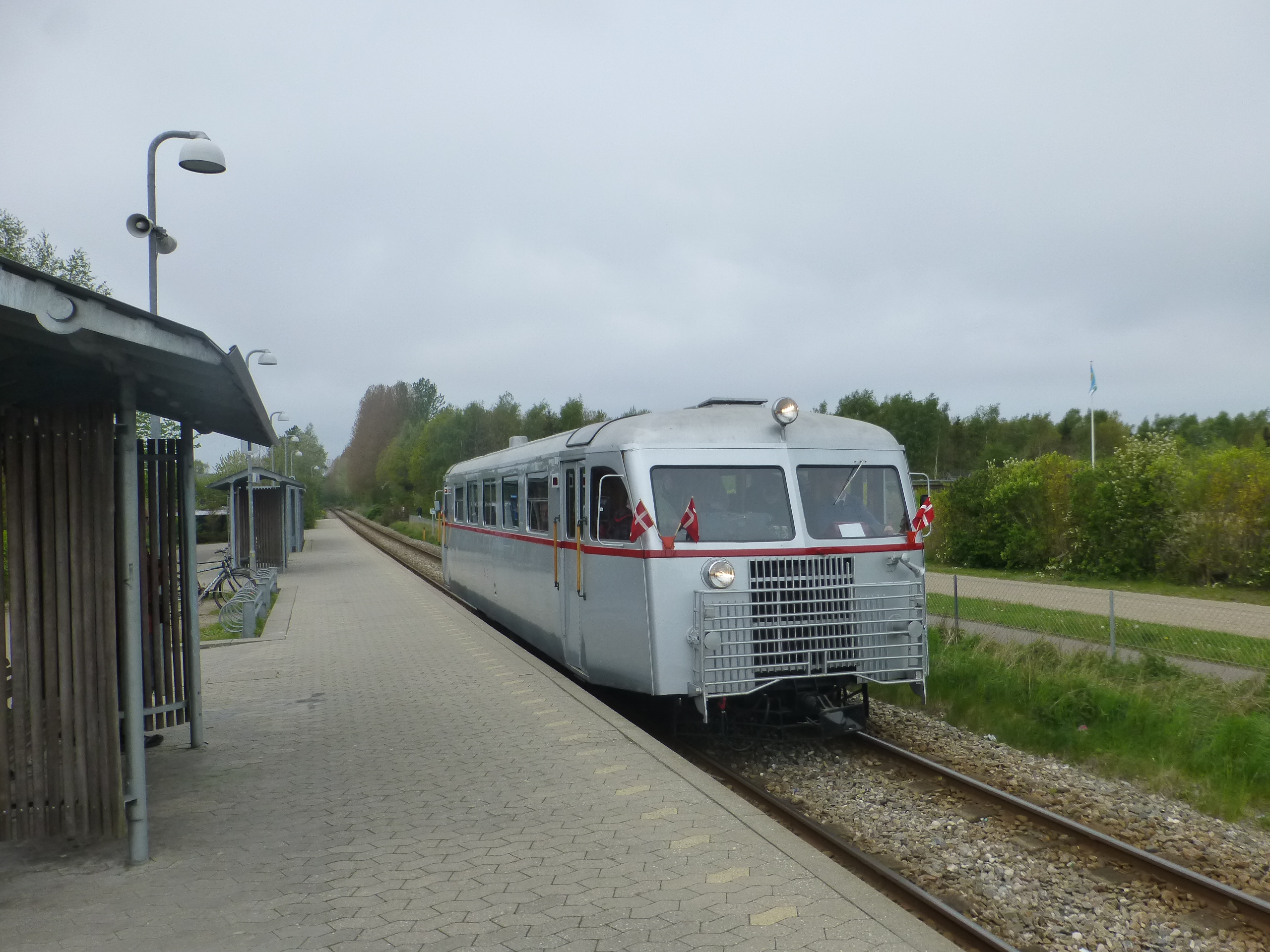
- Heritage railcar at Godhavn halt in 2015

General information
- Location: Godhavnsvej, Godhavn Strand; 3220 Tisvildeleje; Gribskov Municipality; Denmark
- Coordinates: 56°03′35.8″N 12°5′50″E
- Elevation: 25.6 metres (84 ft)
- Owner: Hovedstadens Lokalbaner
- Operator: Lokaltog
- Line: Gribskov Line
- Platforms: 1
- Tracks: 1

History
- Opened: 18 July 1924

Services
| Preceding station | Lokaltog | Following station |
|---|---|---|
| Tisvildeleje Terminus | Gribskov Line Tisvildeleje branch | Holløse towards Hillerød |
Location

Godhavn railway halt (Danish: Godhavn Trinbræt) is a railway halt serving the seaside resort of Tisvilde on the north coast of the island of Zealand, Denmark.

The railway halt is located on the Tisvildeleje branch of the Gribskov railway line from Hillerød to Tisvildeleje. It opened in 1924 with the opening of the Helsinge–Tisvildeleje section of the Gribskov line. The train services are currently operated by the railway company Lokaltog which runs frequent local train services between Hillerød and Tisvildeleje.

== See also ==
- List of railway stations in Denmark
