= Gribskov Line =

Railway line in North Zealand, Denmark

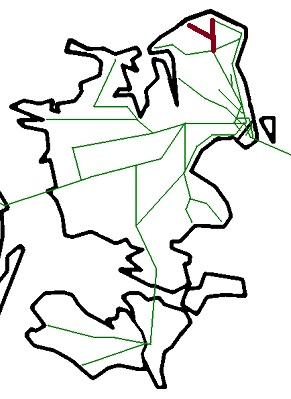

Overview
- Native name: Gribskovbanen
- Status: Active
- Owner: Hovedstadens Lokalbaner
- Termini: Hillerød 55.9270°N 12.3107°E; Tisvildeleje 56.0593°N 12.0778°E Gilleleje 56.1237°N 12.3030°E
- Stations: 19

Service
- Type: Railway
- System: Danish railways
- Operator(s): Lokaltog
- Rolling stock: LINT 41

History
- Opened: Hillerød–Græsted: 20 January 1880; Græsted–Gilleleje: 14 May 1896; Kagerup–Helsinge: 16 June 1897; Helsinge–Tisvildeleje: 18 July 1924

Technical
- Line length: 42.0 kilometres (26.1 mi)
- Number of tracks: Single
- Character: Local railway
- Track gauge: 1,435 mm (4 ft 8 1/2 in)
- Electrification: No
- Operating speed: 75 km/h

The Gribskov Line or the Gribskov Railway (Danish: Gribskovbanen, GDS) is a local passenger railway line in North Zealand north of Copenhagen, Denmark.

The line runs north from Hillerød through the Gribskov forest and splits into two branches to the seaside resort towns of Tisvildeleje and Gilleleje. Connecting the wide belt of holiday homes along the northern coast of Zealand with Copenhagen is an important role of the Gribskov Line.

The railway is standard gauge and single track. It opened in various sections between 1880 and 1924. The distance from Hillerød to either Tisvildeleje or Gilleleje is about 25 kilometres (16 mi), with the total track length being 42.0 kilometres (26.1 mi).

The railway is currently owned by Hovedstadens Lokalbaner and operated by the railway company Lokaltog. Lokaltog runs frequent local train services from Hillerød station to Tisvildeleje station and Gilleleje station with most trains continuing from Gilleleje along the Hornbæk Line to Helsingør station.

== History ==
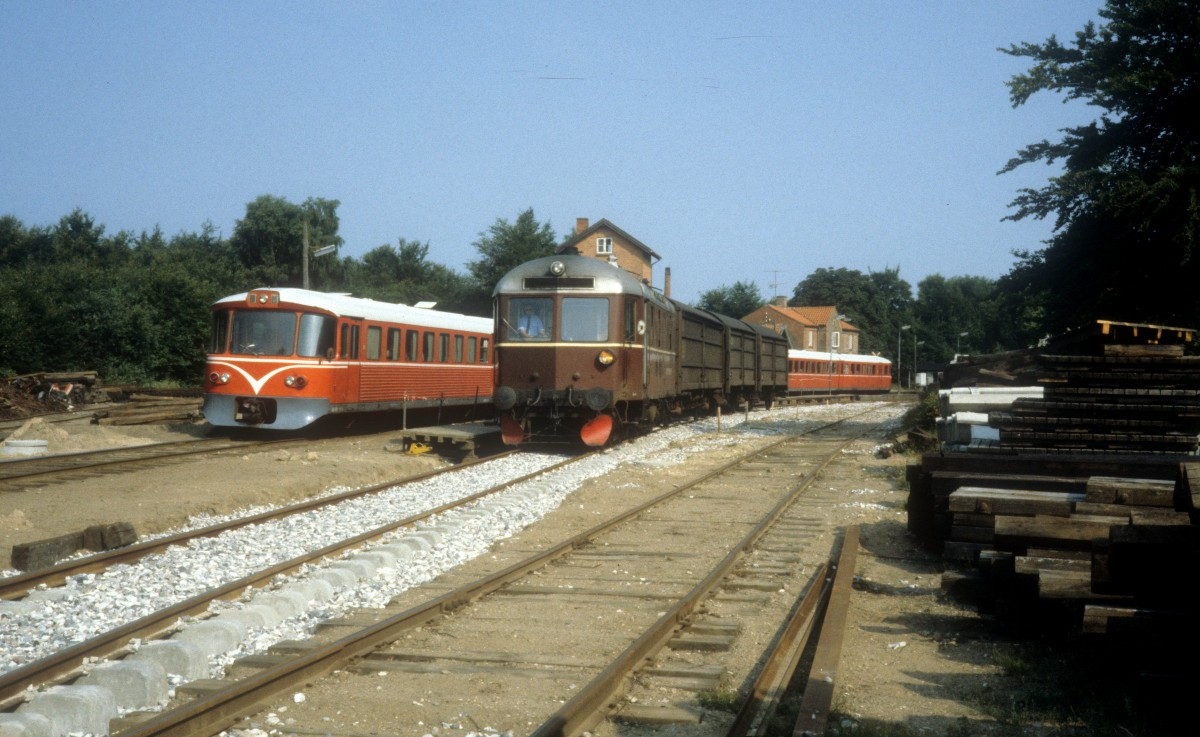
Trains on the Gribskov Line at Kagerup station in 1983.

The railway opened in various sections between 1880 and 1924. The first 19.7 km (12.2 mi) long section of the railway line from Hillerød to Græsted opened on 20 January 1880. The next 6.2 km (3.9 mi) long section from Græsted onwards to Gilleleje opened on 14 May 1896. On 16 June 1897 the 6.0 km (3.7 mi) long branch line from Kagerup to Helsinge opened. The last 10.1 km (6.3 mi) long section from Helsinge to Tisvildeleje opened on 18 July 1924.

== Route ==
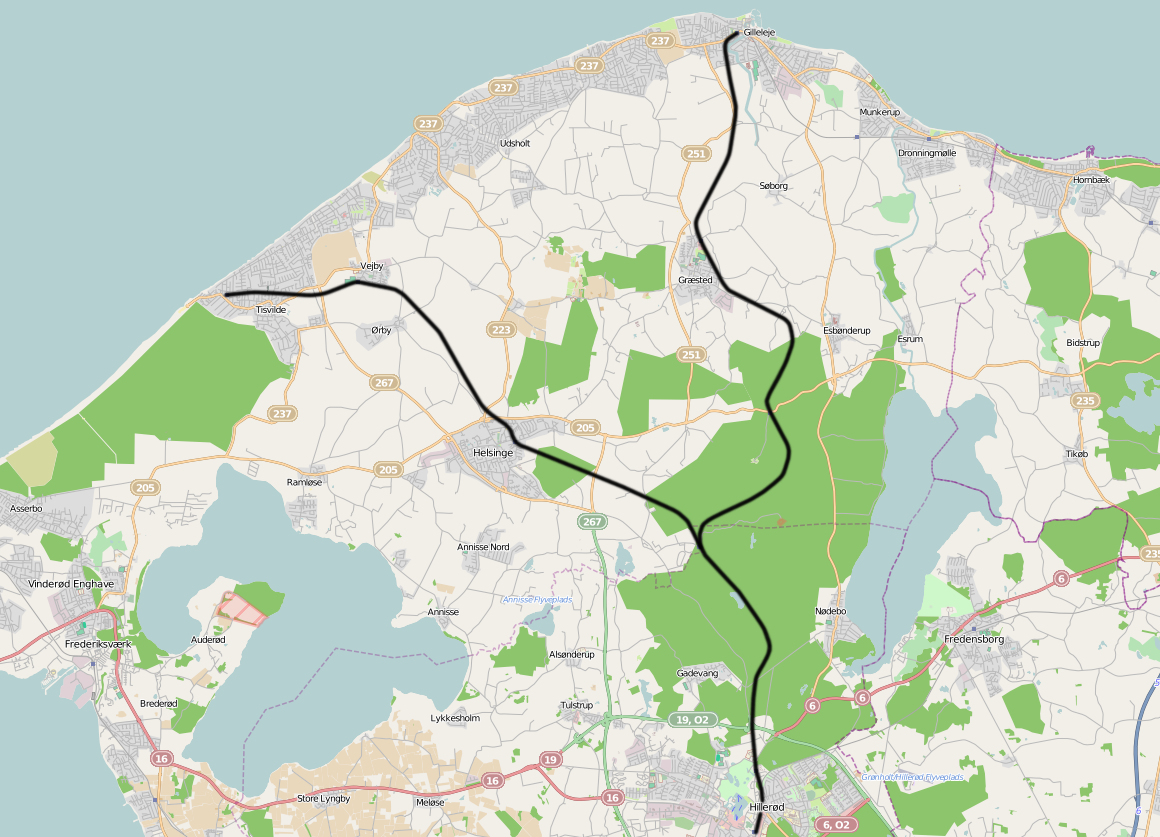
Map of the Gribskov Line

The line runs north from Hillerød where transfers from the S-train system as well as other Lokalbanen lines are possible, and through the Gribskov forest. At Kagerup near the northern end of the forest it splits into two branches going to Tisvildeleje and Gilleleje.

== Operations ==
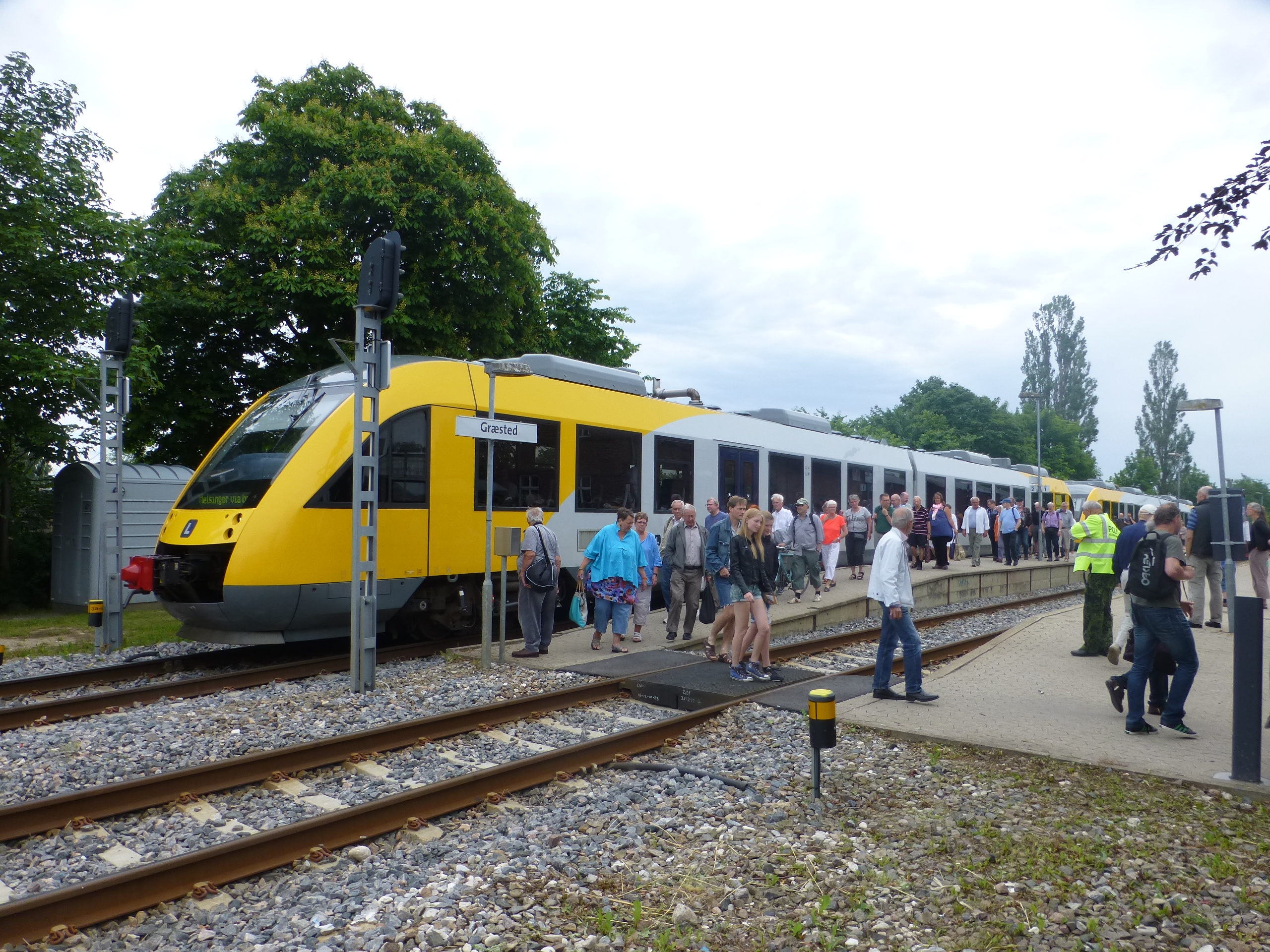
Train on the Gribskov Line calling at Græsted station.

Trains on the Gribskov Line are operated by the railway company Lokaltog. Lokaltog operates a fairly intensive timetable on the Gribskov Line with light DMUs working a fixed 30-minute frequency most of the day. Most passengers connect from the Nordbanen S-trains at Hillerød.

Until late 2007, transfers to and from the Hornbæk Line were needed at Gilleleje, but after major changes to Gilleleje station, trains now operate through Gilleleje to Helsingør along the Hornbæk Line, eliminating the need to change at Gilleleje.

=== Heritage train ===
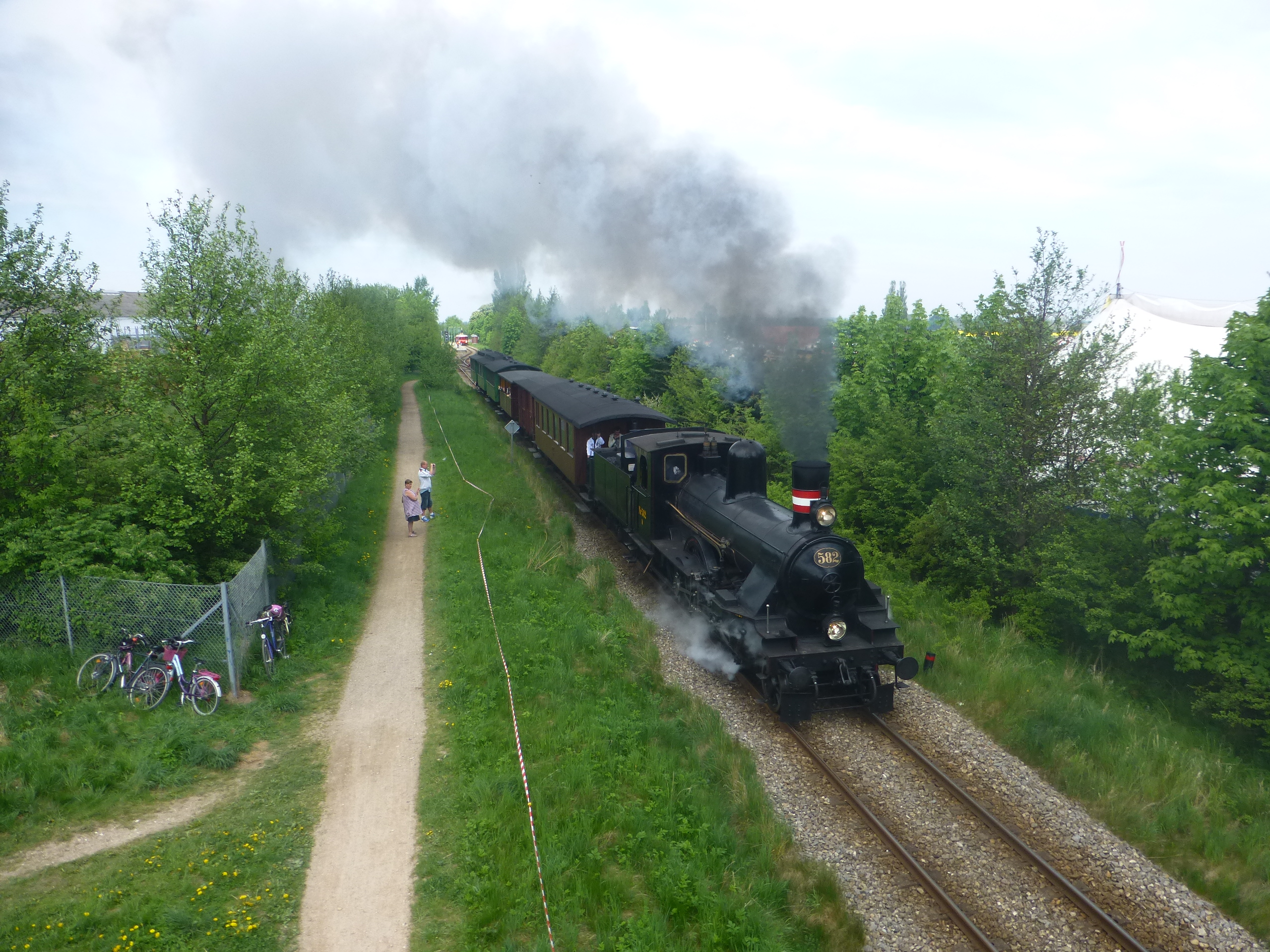
DSB K 582 with restored train at Græsted.

During the summer months of July and August, Nordsjællands Veterantog operates weekend steam trains on the Gribskov Line between Græsted and Gilleleje, continuing along coast on the Hornbæk Line to Grønnehave station in Helsingør. This has been a tradition since 1971.

== Stations ==
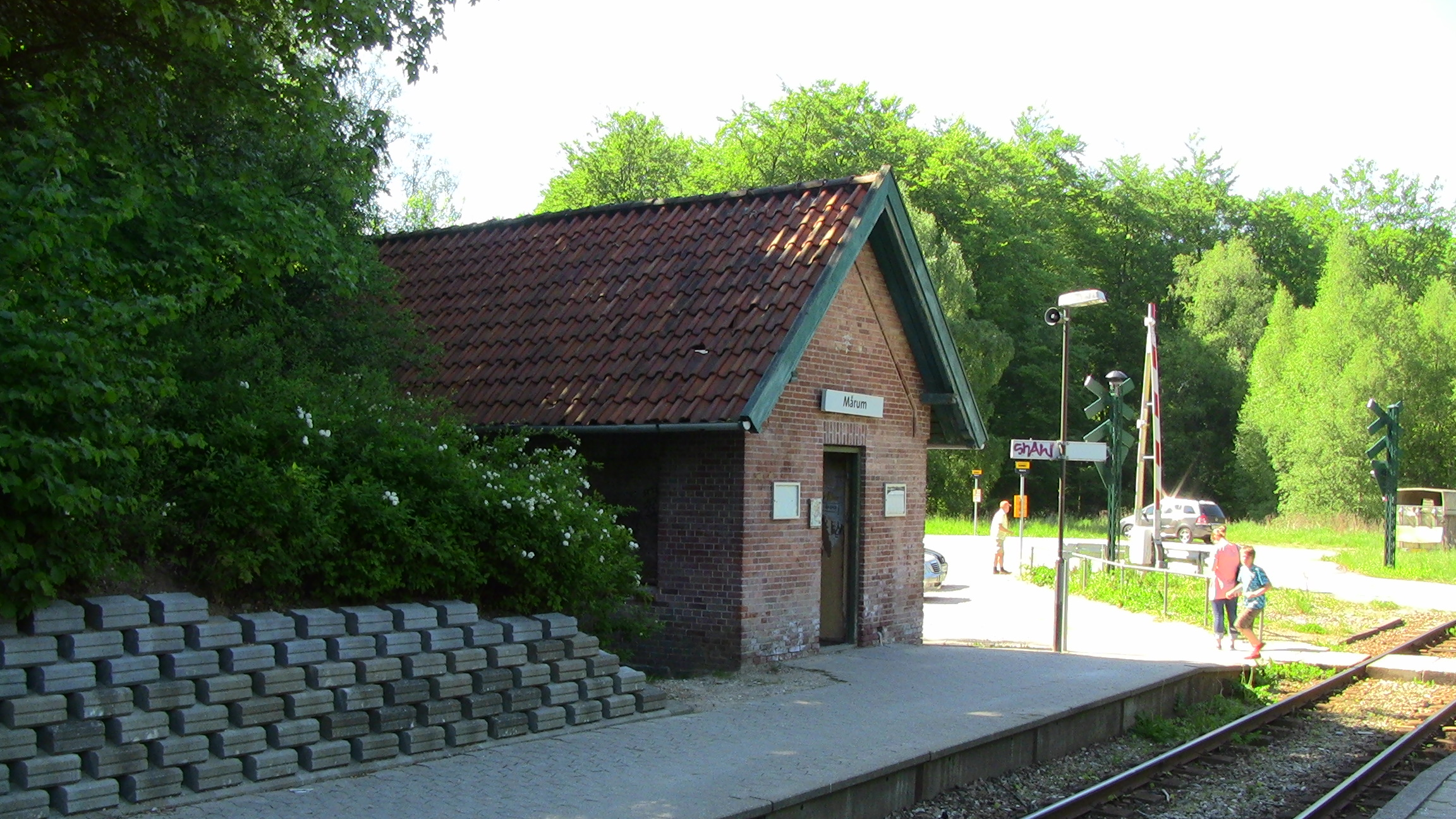
The train station in Mårum in the northwestern parts of Gribskov.

- Hillerød
- Slotspavillonen
- Kildeport (closed)
- Gribsø
- Kagerup

=== Tisvildeleje branch ===
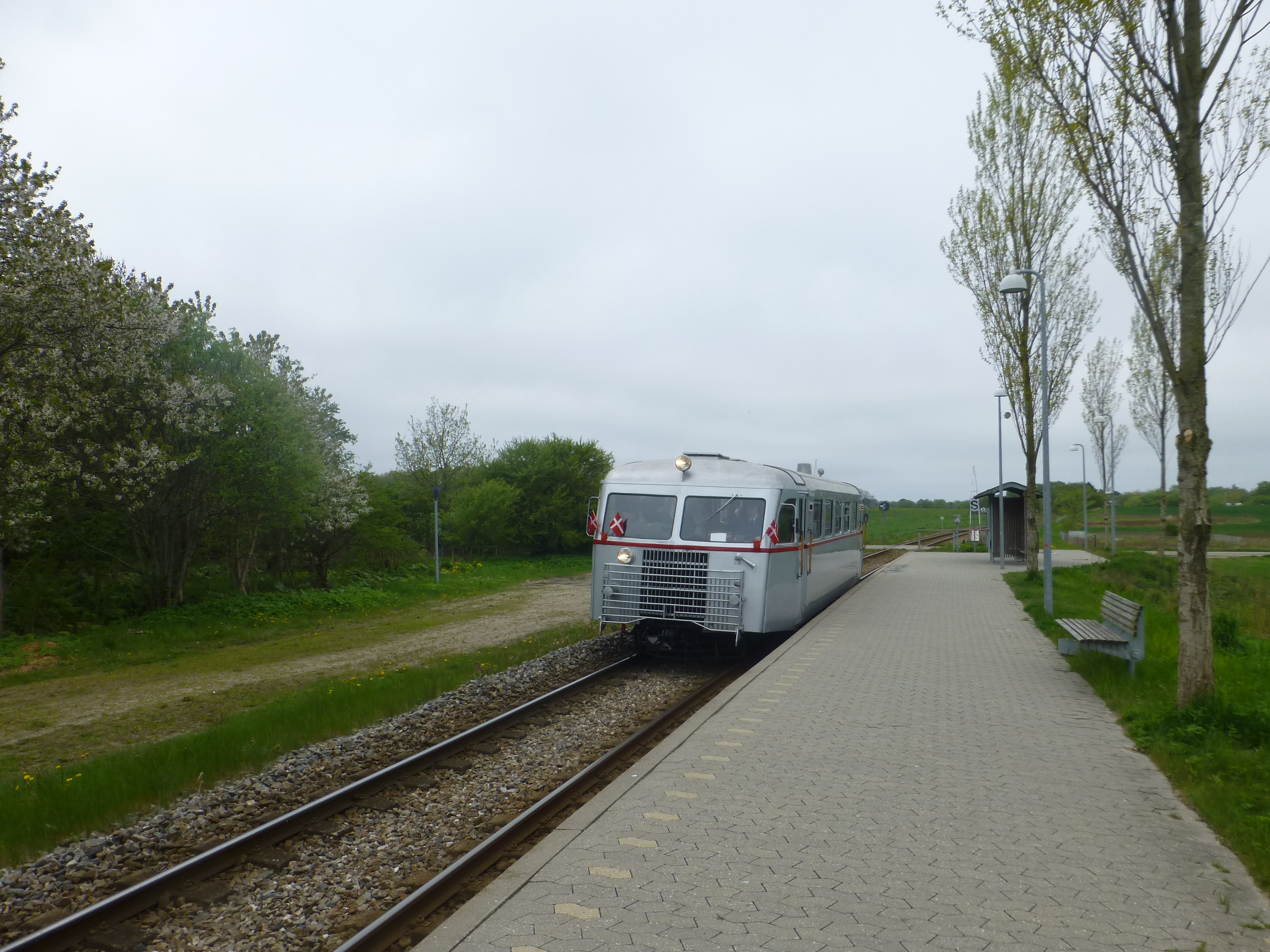
Heritage railcar at Holløse halt in 2015

- Duemose
- Høbjerg (closed)
- Helsinge
- Laugø
- Ørby
- Vejby
- Holløse: a railway halt serving the village of Holløse as well as the eastern part of the seaside resort of Tisvilde. It opened in 1924 with the opening of the Helsinge–Tisvildeleje section of the Gribskov line.
- Godhavn
- Tisvildeleje

=== Gilleleje branch ===
- Storkevad (closed)
- Mårum
- Saltrup
- Vokstrup (closed)
- Græsted South
- Græsted
- Pårup
- Fjellenstrup
- Gilleleje

== See also ==
- List of railway lines in Denmark
- The Hornbæk Line
