= Pårup railway halt =

Railway halt in North Zealand, Denmark

Pårup
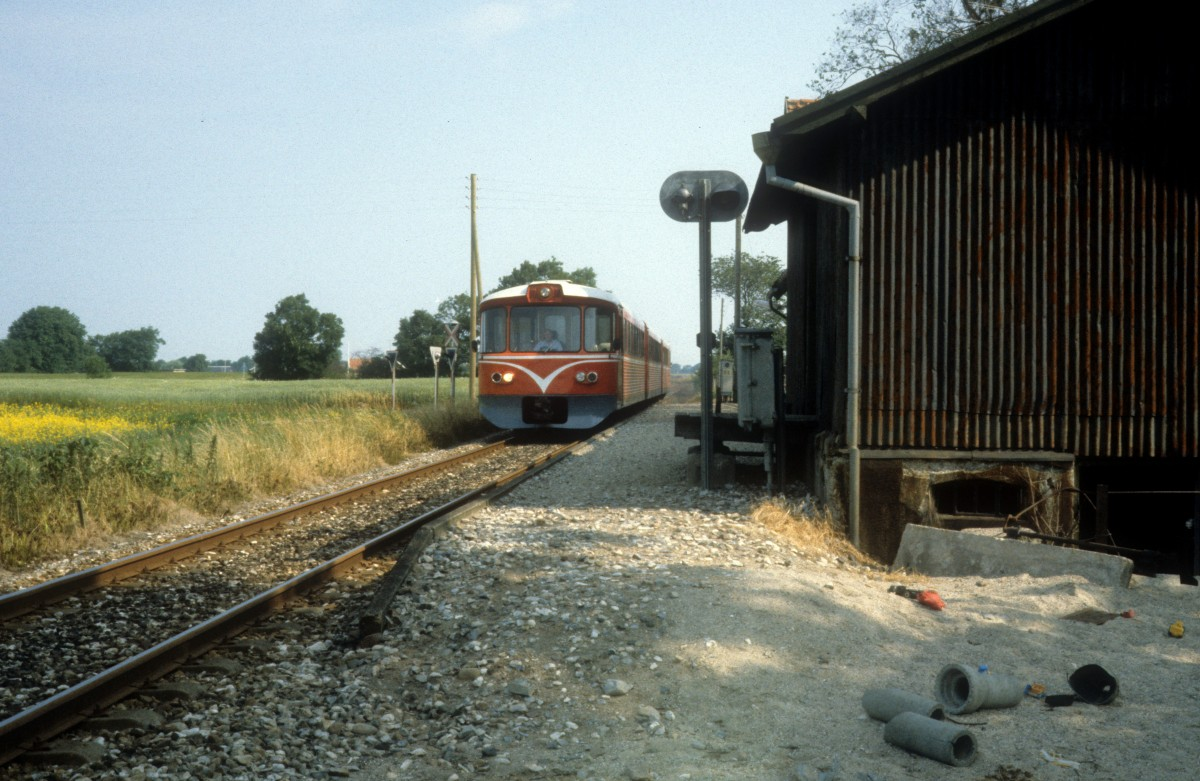
- Pårup railway halt in 1983

General information
- Location: Ålekistevej; 3230 Græsted; Denmark
- Coordinates: 56°06′3″N 12°18′5″E
- Elevation: 8.0 metres (26.2 ft)
- Owner: Hovedstadens Lokalbaner
- Operator: Lokaltog
- Line: Gribskov Line
- Platforms: 1
- Tracks: 1

History
- Opened: 1896

Services
Preceding station	Lokaltog	Following station
Fjellenstrup towards Gilleleje	Gribskov Line Gilleleje branch	Græsted towards Hillerød
Location

Pårup halt is a railway halt serving the small settlement of Pårup near Gilleleje in North Zealand, Denmark.

Pårup halt is located on the Gribskov Line from Hillerød to Gilleleje. The train services are currently operated by the railway company Lokaltog which runs frequent local train services between Hillerød station and Gilleleje station.

The station was opened in 1896 with the opening of the Græsted-Gilleleje section of the Gribskov Line. The original station building was designed by architect Heinrich Wenck. The station building was torn down in 1984.

== Cultural references ==
=== In film ===
Pårup station is used as a location in the 1957 Danish film Be Dear to Me (Danish: Ingen tid til kærtegn).

=== In visual art ===
Pårup station is the motive of the 1980 painting Pårup Station by the Danish painter and graphic artist Niels Strøbek, primarily known for his super-realist paintings and portraits.

== See also ==
- List of railway stations in Denmark
