= Saltrup railway halt =

Railway halt in North Zealand, Denmark

Saltrup
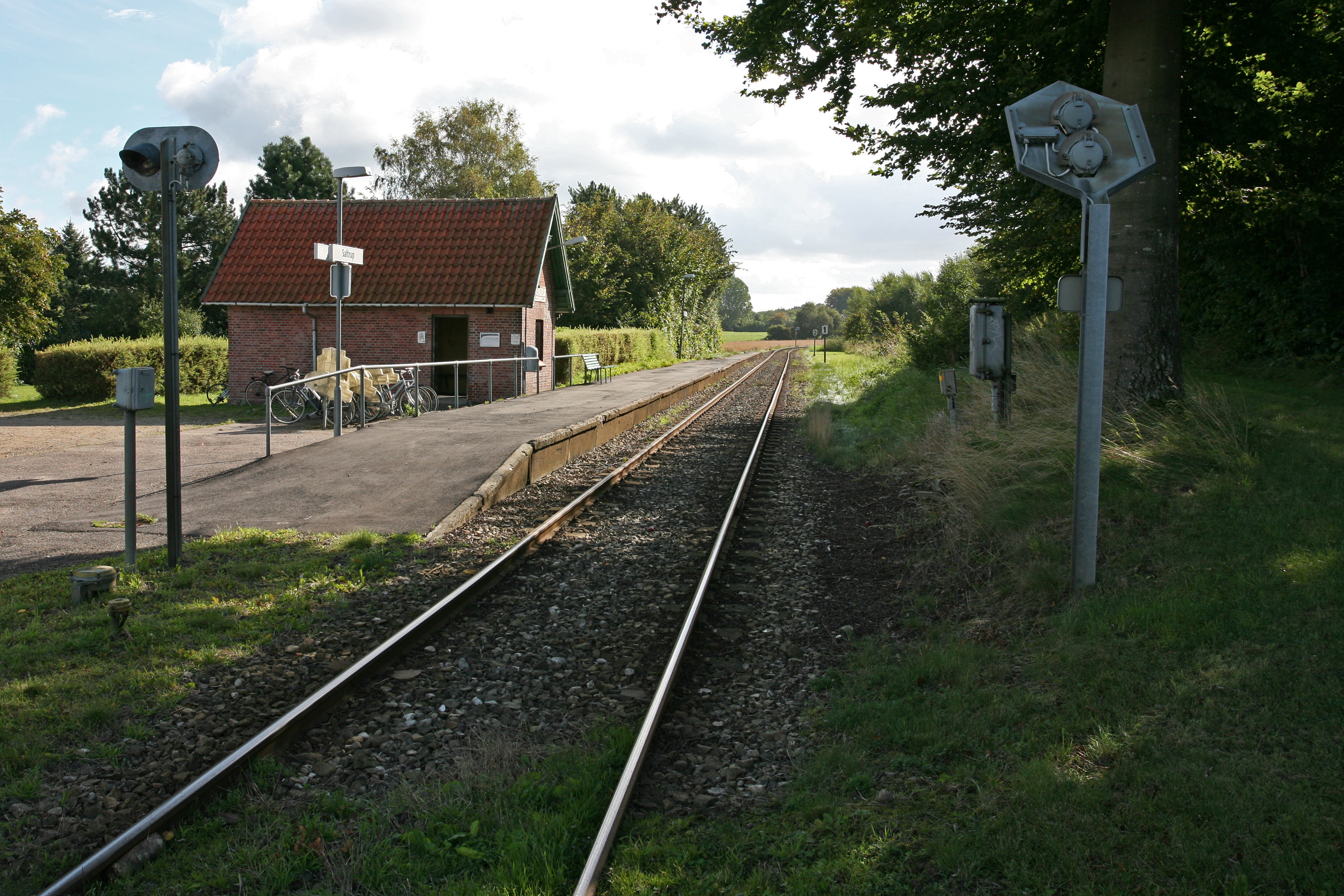
- Saltrup railway halt in 2007

General information
- Location: Saltrup Vænge; Saltrup, 3230 Græsted; Gribskov Municipality; Denmark
- Coordinates: 56°03′16.03″N 12°19′18.81″E
- Elevation: 18.0 metres (59.1 ft)
- Owner: Hovedstadens Lokalbaner
- Operator: Lokaltog
- Line: Gribskov Line
- Platforms: 1
- Tracks: 1

Services
Preceding station	Lokaltog	Following station
Græsted South towards Gilleleje	Gribskov Line Gilleleje branch	Mårum towards Hillerød
Location

Saltrup halt is a railway halt serving the village of Saltrup in North Zealand, Denmark.

Saltrup is located on the Gribskov Line from Hillerød to Gilleleje. The train services are operated by the railway company Lokaltog which runs frequent local train services between Hillerød station and Gilleleje station.

== Cultural references ==
Saltrup railway halt is used as a location in the film Fætrene på Torndal (1973). In the beginning of the film, Karl Stegger and Arthur Jensen are seen arriving to the halt by way of Boserupvej wgile. Axel Strøbye is looking on the railway tracks in the direction towards Græsted before the train passes. At 24:00, Kurt Ravn is seen crossing the railway tracks. Towards the end of the film, when the estate manager's car is stuck between the two booms, a train is seen approaching the Hillerød side.

== See also ==
- List of railway stations in Denmark
- Rail transport in Denmark
