= Slotspavillonen railway halt =

Railway halt in Hillerød, Denmark

Slotspavillonen
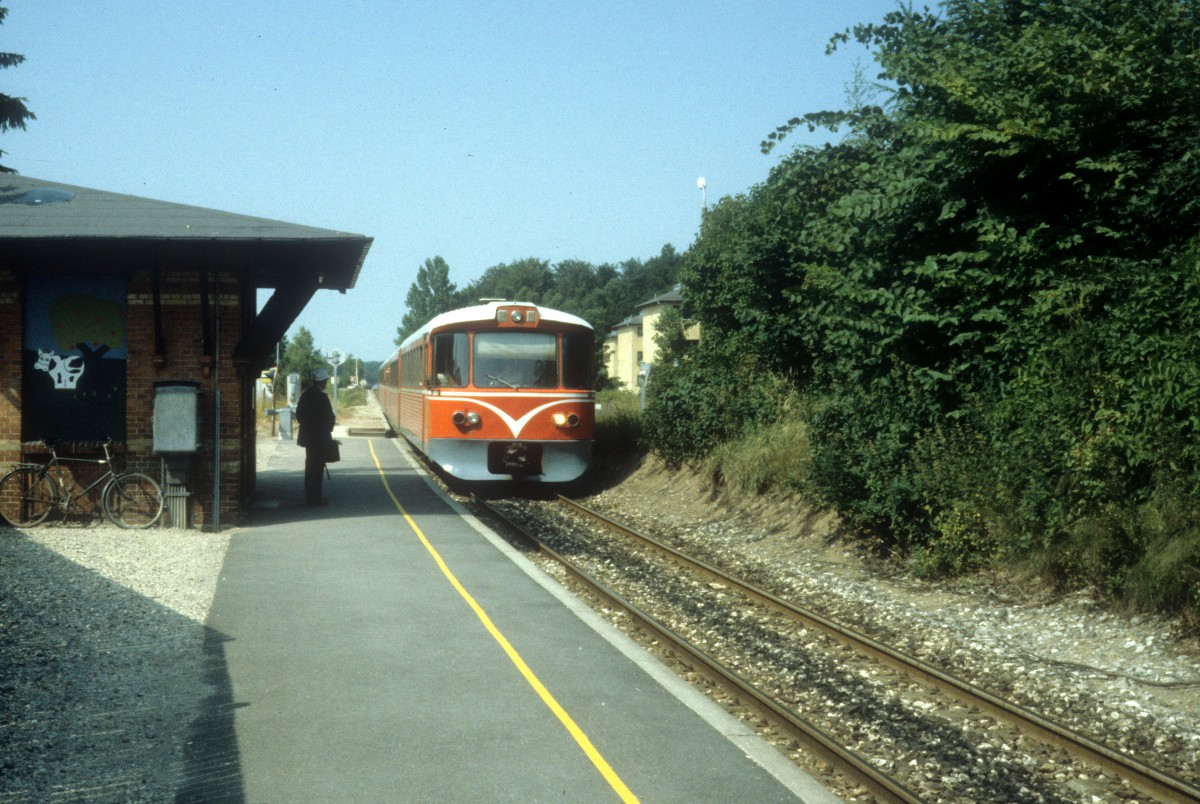
- Slotspavillonen railway halt in 1983

General information
- Location: Gammel Holmegårdsvej; 3400 Hillerød; Hillerød Municipality; Denmark
- Coordinates: 55°56′33.33″N 12°18′39.69″E
- Elevation: 48.5 metres (159 ft)
- Owner: Hovedstadens Lokalbaner
- Operator: Lokaltog
- Line: Gribskov Line
- Platforms: 1 island platform
- Tracks: 2

Construction
- Structure type: At-grade

Other information
- Station code: Spg

History
- Opened: 20 January 1880

Services
| Preceding station | Lokaltog | Following station |
|---|---|---|
| Gribsø towards Tisvildeleje | Gribskov Line Tisvildeleje branch | Hillerød Terminus |
| Gribsø towards Gilleleje | Gribskov Line Gilleleje branch | Hillerød Terminus |
Location

Slotspavillonen halt (Danish: Slotspavillonen Trinbræt) is a railway halt serving the northern part of the town of Hillerød in North Zealand, Denmark.

The station is located on the Gribskov Line from Hillerød to Tisvildeleje and Gilleleje respectively. It opened in 1880 with the opening of the first section of the Gribskov Line from Hillerød to Græsted. The halt was named for the no longer existing restaurant Slotspavillonen (English: the Castle Pavilion) which had opened in the northern part of the park of Frederiksborg Castle in the summer of 1872.

The train services are currently operated by the railway company Lokaltog which runs frequent local train services between Hillerød station and Tisvildeleje station / Gilleleje station.

== See also ==
- List of railway stations in Denmark
- Rail transport in Denmark
- Transport in Denmark
