= Græsted South railway halt =

Railway halt in North Zealand, Denmark

Græsted Syd
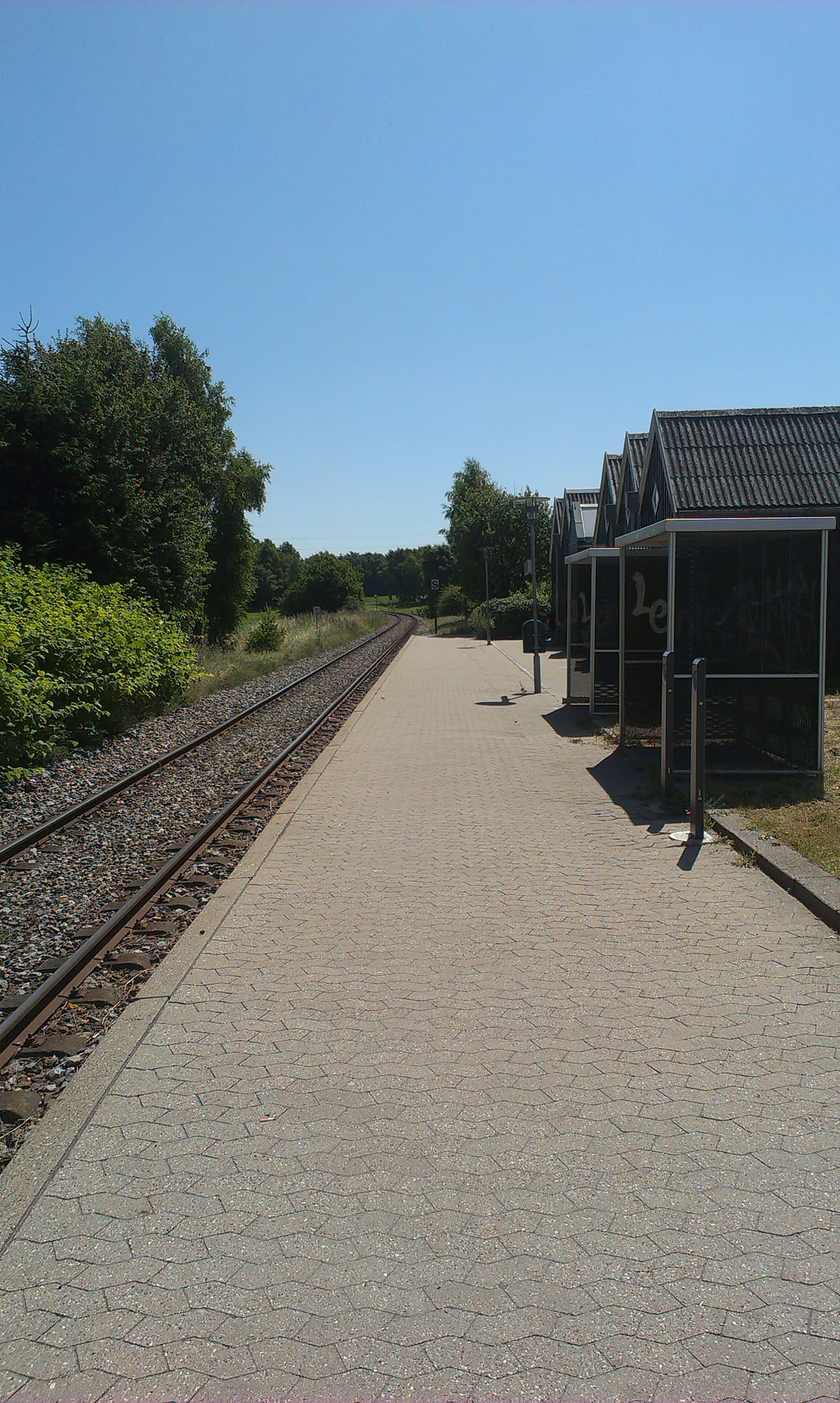
- Græsted South railway halt in 2013

General information
- Location: Holtvej 8A; 3230 Græsted; Gribskov Municipality; Denmark
- Coordinates: 56°03′47.15″N 12°17′44.27″E
- Elevation: 20.4 metres (67 ft)
- Owner: Hovedstadens Lokalbaner
- Operator: Lokaltog
- Line: Gribskov Line
- Platforms: 1
- Tracks: 1

Services
Preceding station	Lokaltog	Following station
Græsted towards Gilleleje	Gribskov Line Gilleleje branch	Saltrup towards Hillerød
Location

Græsted South halt (Danish: Græsted Syd Trinbræt; previously: Pibemose Trinbræt) is a railway halt serving the southeastern part of the town of Græsted in North Zealand, Denmark.

Græsted South is located on the Gribskov Line from Hillerød to Gilleleje. The train services are operated by the railway company Lokaltog which runs frequent local train services between Hillerød station and Gilleleje station.

== See also ==
- List of railway stations in Denmark
