= Kagerup =

- Village
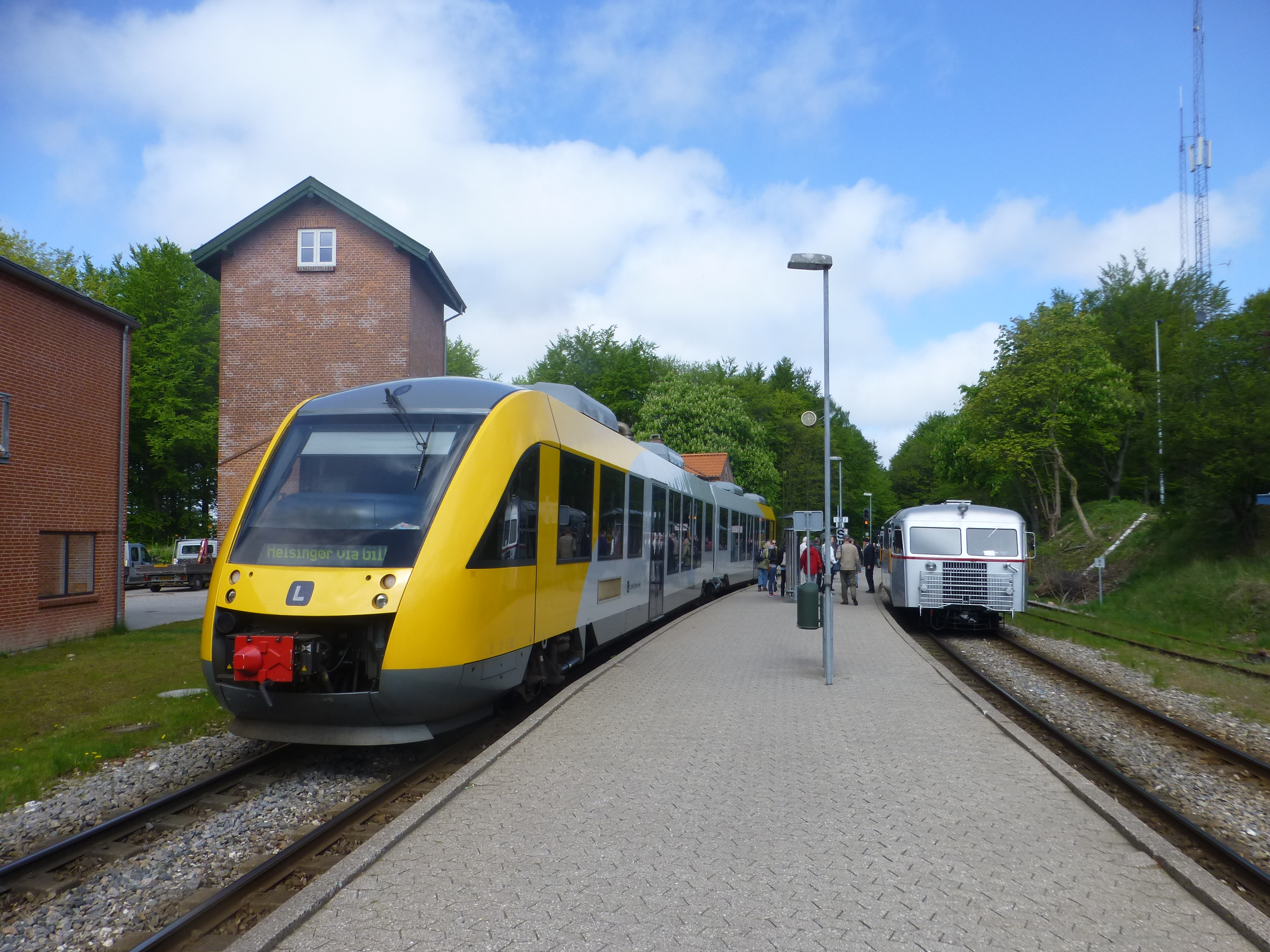
- Kagerup railway station

- Location within Denmark Location within Capital Region
- Coordinates: 55°59′49″N 12°16′09″E
- Country: Denmark
- Region: Capital (Hovedstaden)
- Municipality: Gribskov

Population (2026)
  - Urban: 401

Kagerup is a village in the Gribskov Municipality in North Zealand, Denmark. It is located six kilometers southeast of Helsinge and 10 kilometers north of Hillerød. As of 2026, it had a population of 401.

Kagerup is served by Kagerup railway station, located on the Gribskov railway line, about 1 km (0.62 mi) west of the village.
