= Fjellenstrup railway halt =

Railway halt in Gilleleje, Denmark

Fjellenstrup

General information
- Location: Parkvej, 3250 Gilleleje; Gribskov Municipality; Denmark
- Coordinates: 56°06′58.6″N 12°17′54.29″E
- Elevation: 9.1 metres (30 ft)
- Owner: Hovedstadens Lokalbaner
- Operator: Lokaltog
- Line: Gribskov Line
- Platforms: 1
- Tracks: 1

Services
| Preceding station | Lokaltog | Following station |
|---|---|---|
| Gilleleje Terminus | Gribskov Line Gilleleje branch | Pårup towards Hillerød |
Location

Fjellenstrup halt is a railway halt serving the settlement of Fjellenstrup near Gilleleje on the north coast of Zealand, Denmark.

Fjellenstrup halt is located on the Gribskov Line from Hillerød to Gilleleje. The train services are currently operated by the railway company Lokaltog which runs frequent local train services between Helsingør station and Gilleleje station.

== See also ==
- List of railway stations in Denmark
