= Nordsjællands Veterantog =

Coordinates: 56.0727°N 12.2867°E

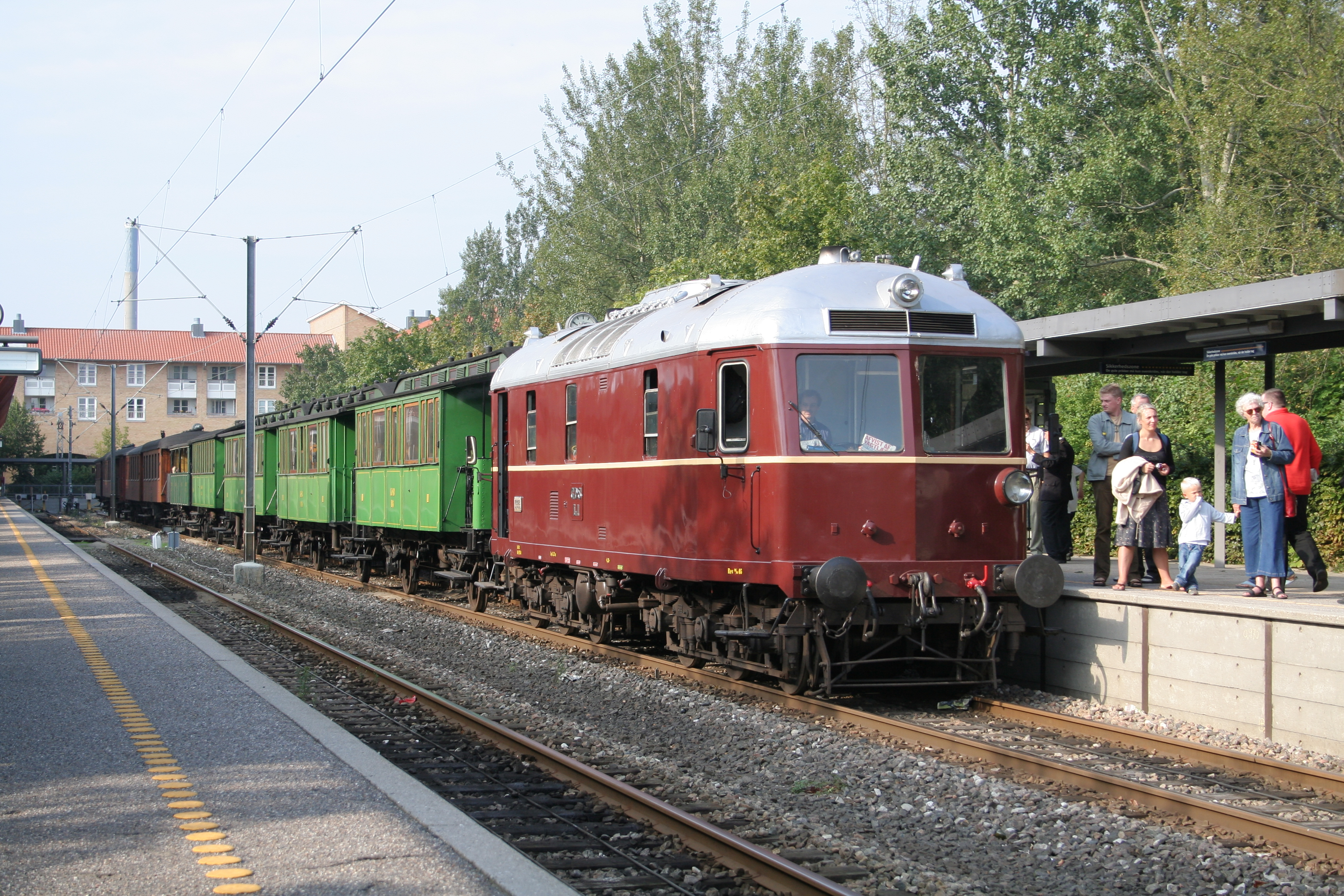
An NSJV restored train at Farum station with GDS L1 at its head.

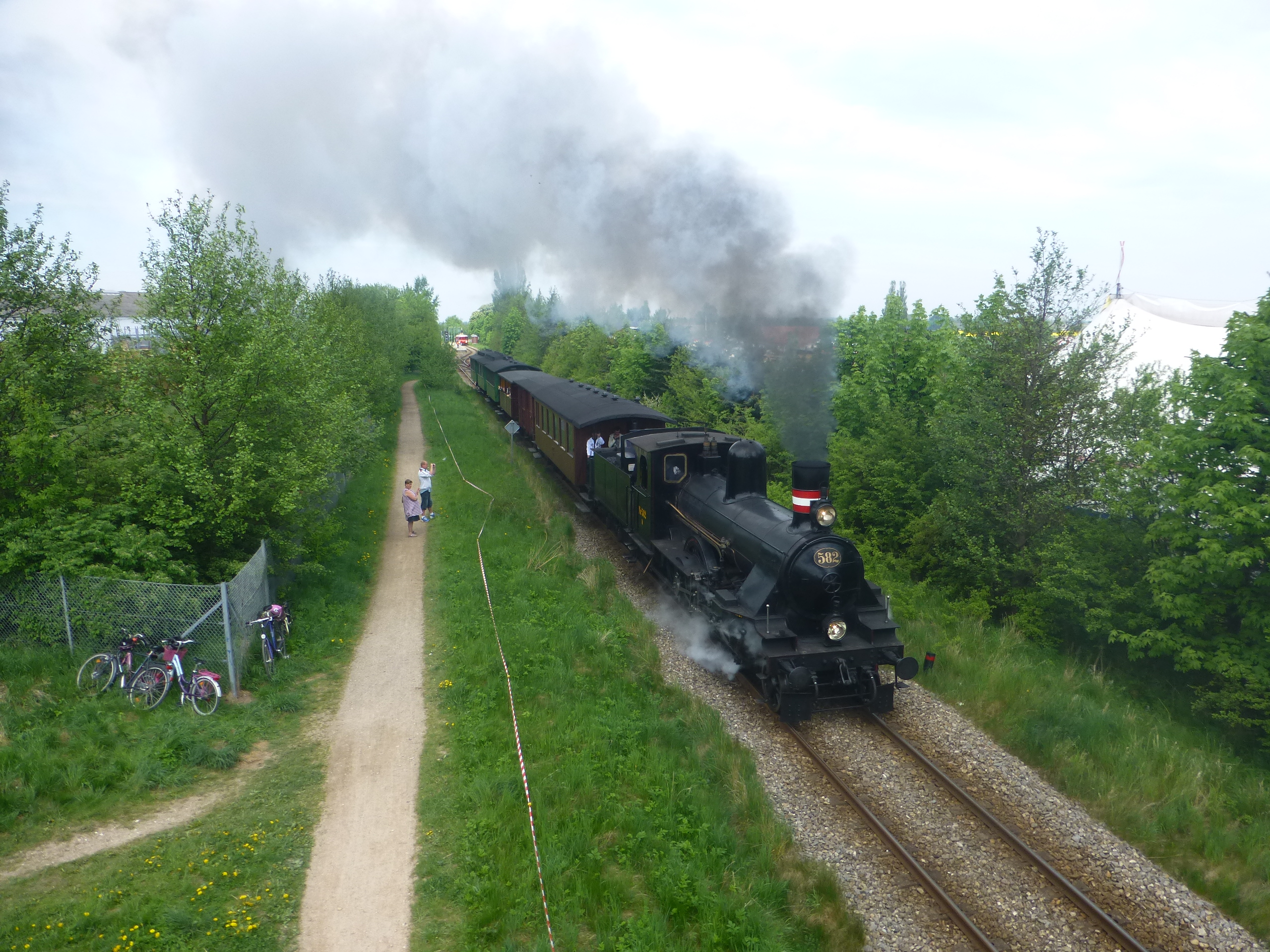
DSB K 582 with restored train at Græsted.

Nordsjællands Veterantog (NSJV) was founded as Helsingør Jernbaneklub in 1958 as a model railway club in Helsingør, Denmark. The club had its ups and downs in the early years, but the big turning point was when it was decided to try and work with scale 1:1. In 1968, the first service was operated and soon the club had turned into a heritage railway rather than a model railway club.

Acitivies soon grew and kept doing so steadily over the years. In 1992 it was decided to reorganise activities, essentially creating a foundation to take care of "business" issues. This foundation is the proper hold of the name Nordsjællands Veterantog, which translations into Heritage Railway of North Zealand. The club was responsible for the maintenance and operations, and this was renamed in 1995 to Nordsjællands Jernbaneklub (Railway Club of North Zealand) in order to match the name of the foundation.

NSJV has never owned their own tracks. Instead, services are operated on regular railway tracks used by operators such as DSB and Lokaltog. Services run mostly in Northern Zealand, with scheduled services running on weekends and Wednesdays throughout the summer.

Activities are based around two locations: The old station in Græsted is the home of the foundation and the club and also houses maintenance for carriages and diesel locomotives, whereas Rungsted depot is the home of the steam locomotives. Operational locomotives include three steam locomotives, two diesel locomotives, and various shunting and service vehicles. Both depots are now owned by NSJV.

In 2009, restored steam locomotive DSB K-582 entered service after a long project to bring it back to life. It has been restored to the class K look with the new, larger boiler and round dome. While it is still air-braked and thus has a Knorr pump on the side, most components of the air braking system (including the tanks) have been hidden from view to get as close as possible to the vacuum-braked look.

The Rungsted depot is now being prepared for the next major project, the restoration of DSB S-740, which was featured in the James Bond movie Octopussy. Work still continues in the Græsted depot on the GDS L1 locomotive.
