= Mårum =

- Village
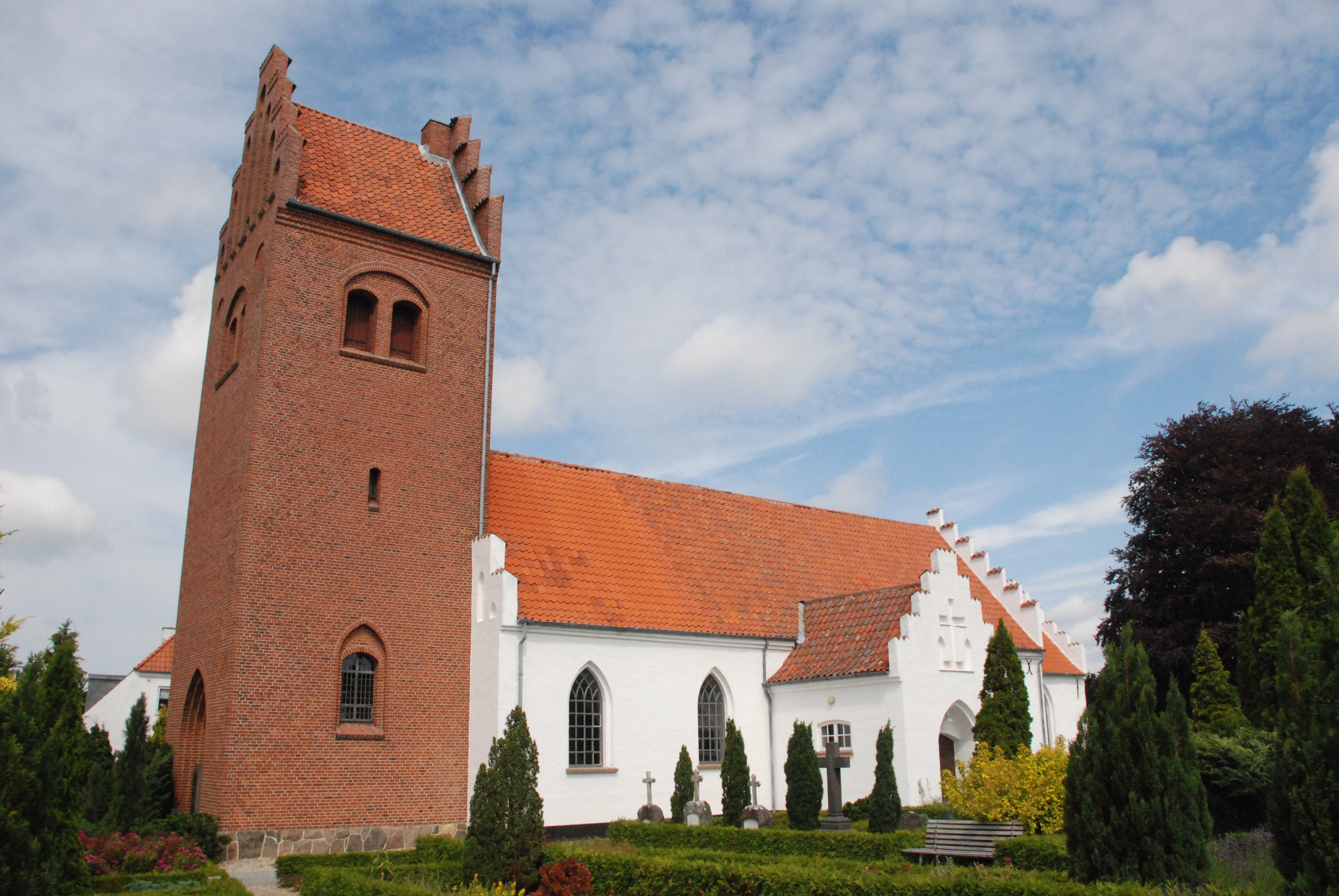
- Mårum Church

- Location within Denmark Location within Capital Region
- Coordinates: 56°01′42″N 12°16′59″E
- Country: Denmark
- Region: Capital (Hovedstaden)
- Municipality: Gribskov

Population (2026)
  - Urban: 220

Mårum is a town in the Gribskov Municipality in North Zealand, Denmark. It is located six kilometers east of Helsinge and four kilometers north of Kagerup. As of 2026, it has a population of 220.
