= Græsted railway station =

Railway station in North Zealand, Denmark

Græsted
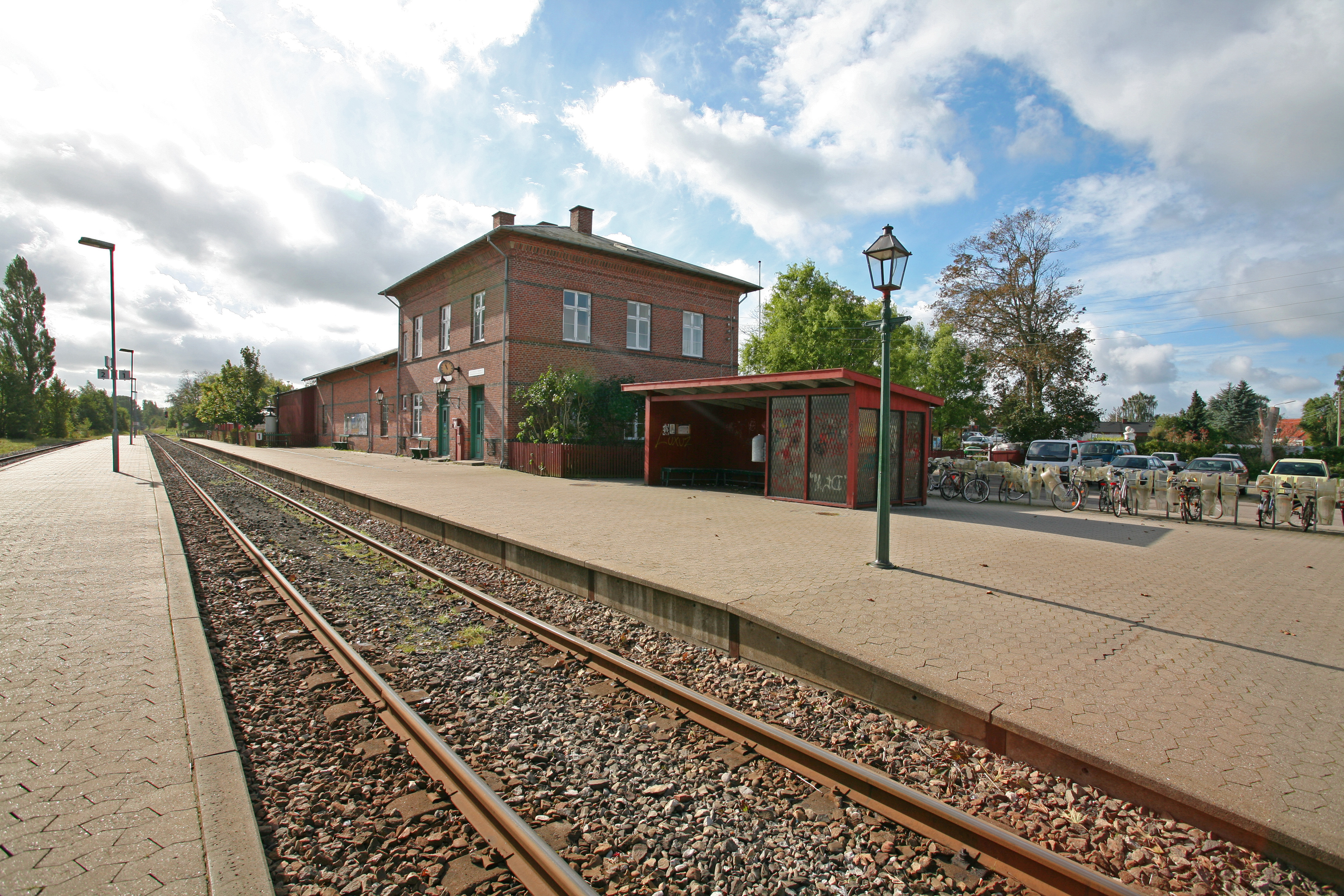
- Græsted station in 2007

General information
- Location: Græsted Stationsvej 84A; 3230 Græsted; Gribskov Municipality; Denmark
- Coordinates: 56°4′21.45″N 12°17′12.43″E
- Elevation: 19.7 metres (65 ft)
- Owner: Hovedstadens Lokalbaner
- Operator: Lokaltog
- Line: Gribskov Line
- Platforms: 2
- Tracks: 2

History
- Opened: 1880

Services
Preceding station	Lokaltog	Following station
Pårup towards Gilleleje	Gribskov Line Gilleleje branch	Græsted South towards Hillerød
Location

Græsted station is a railway station serving the town of Græsted in North Zealand, Denmark.

Græsted station is located on the Gribskov Line from Hillerød to Gilleleje. The station was opened in 1880 with the opening of the Hillerød-Græsted section of the Gribskov Line. The train services are operated by the railway company Lokaltog.

== See also ==
- List of railway stations in Denmark
