= Tisvildeleje railway station =

Railway station in Tisvildeleje, Denmark

Tisvildeleje
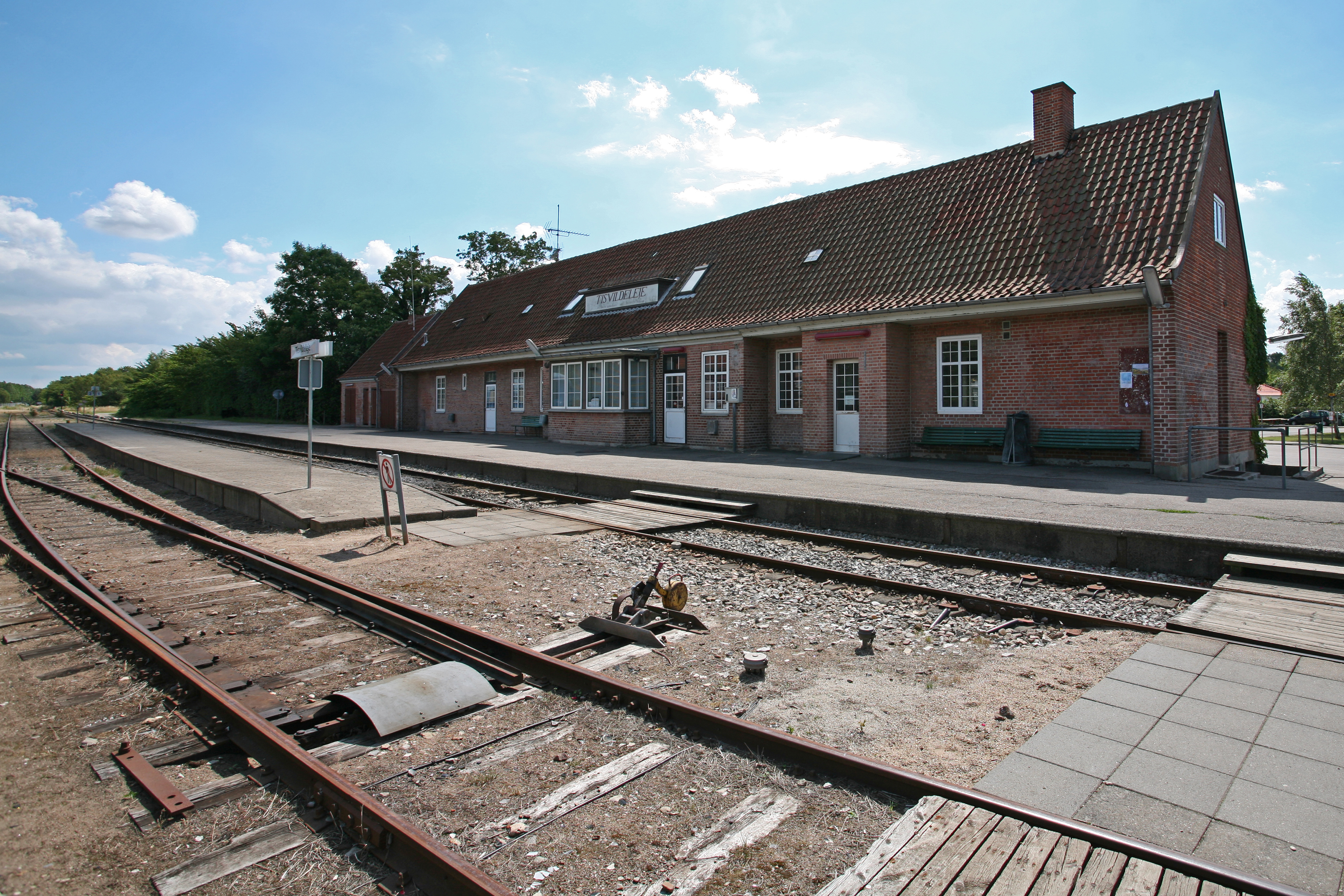
- Tisvildeleje station in 2008

General information
- Location: Banevej 8; 3220 Tisvildeleje; Gribskov Municipality; Denmark
- Coordinates: 56°03′33″N 12°04′40″E
- Elevation: 26.4 metres (87 ft)
- Operator: Lokaltog
- Line: Gribskov Line
- Platforms: 2
- Tracks: 2

Construction
- Architect: Carl Lundquist

History
- Opened: 18 July 1924

Services
Preceding station	Lokaltog	Following station
Terminus	Gribskov Line Tisvildeleje branch	Godhavn towards Hillerød
Location

Tisvildeleje station is the main railway station serving the seaside resort town of Tisvildeleje on the north coast of North Zealand, Denmark.

The station is the terminus of the Tisvildeleje branch of the Gribskov Line from Hillerød to Tisvildeleje. It opened in 1924 with the opening of the Helsinge–Tisvildeleje section of the Gribskov line. The train services are currently operated by the railway company Lokaltog which runs frequent local train services from Tisvildeleje to Hillerød station.

== Cultural references ==
The station is used as a location in the 1945 film En ny dag gryer,

== See also ==
- List of railway stations in Denmark
