= Tisvildeleje =

Village and coastal area in Denmark

Coordinates: 56°03′33″N 12°04′28″E

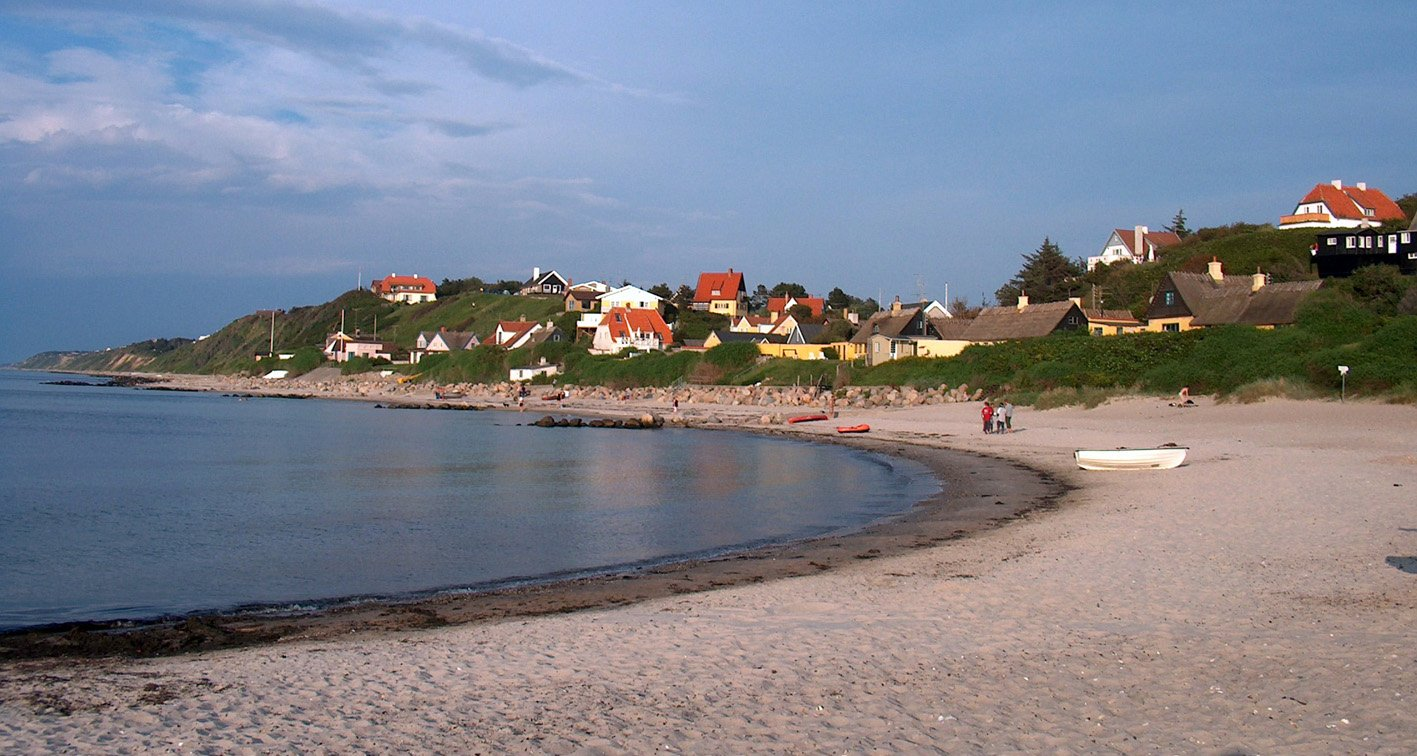
Tisvildeleje, Denmark

Tisvildeleje is a village and the coastal part of the town Tisvilde, located on the north coast of the island of Zealand (Sjælland) in Denmark, 60 km/40miles north of Copenhagen in Region Hovedstaden.

To the west, Tisvildeleje is bordered by the protected plantation of Tisvilde Hegn ("Tisvilde Fence"), which is Denmark's fifth largest forest. The beaches of Tisvildeleje are known for their white sands and soft dunes.

The beach uses large boulders as rock armour and groynes for sea defense in most places. A sea wall also protects a stretch of the coast.

== History ==
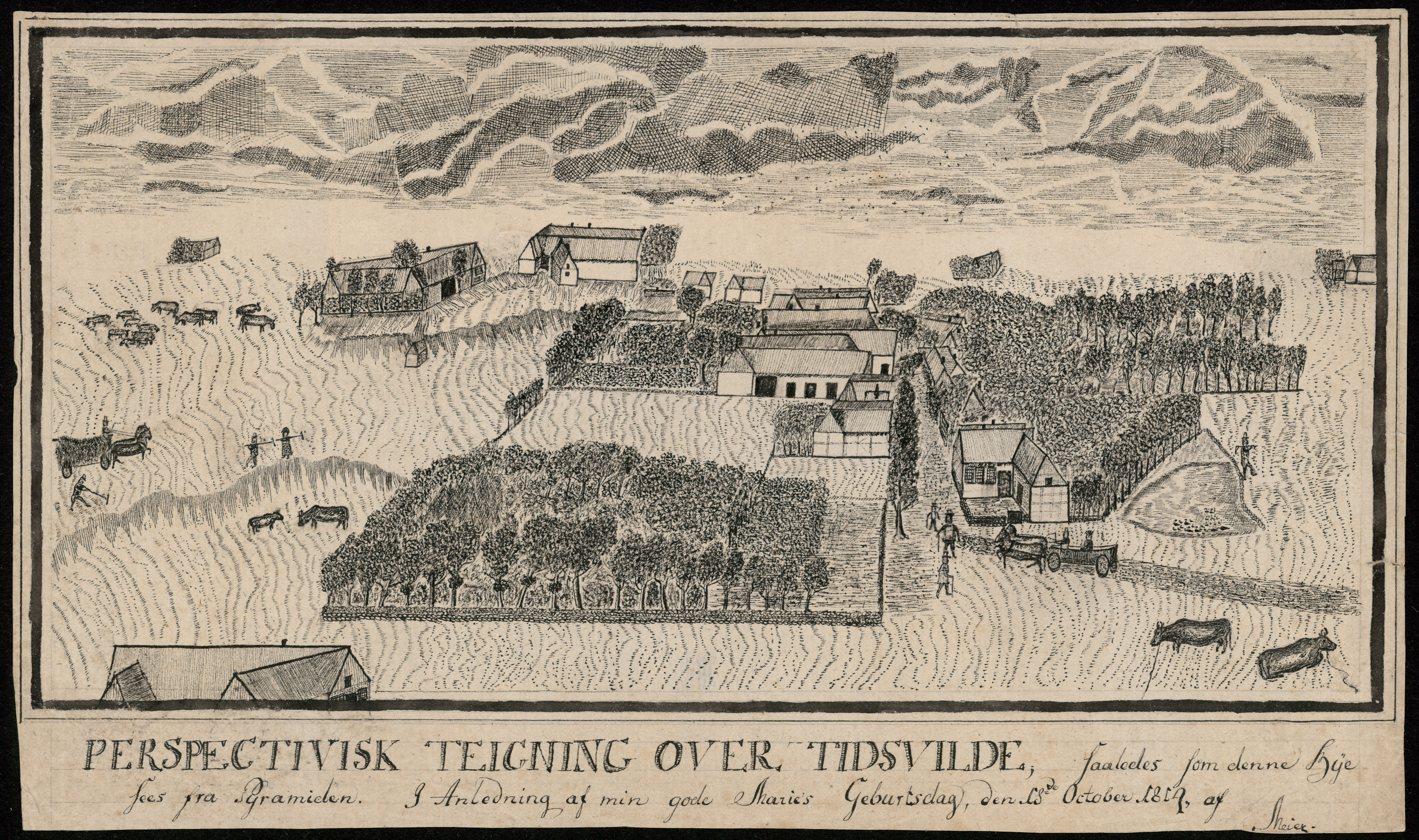
Tisvilde in 1819.

The name "Tisvilde" is derived from "Ti's vælde", meaning a place dedicated to the God Tyr. Where the church of Tibirke Kirke is situated nowadays, there was once a prehistoric “vi” meaning a holy place or place of sacrifice. In prehistoric times, humans were sacrificed here. At the foot of the church, is a spring which may have been a place of pilgrimage in days of old. "Leje" roughly translates as plain and used to be a fishermen's village. Now most of the fishermen's houses, are used as summer residences.

Helene Spring in Tisvildeleje is located close to the sea and is among Denmark's most famous springs. Legend has it that anyone whose illness has not responded successfully to other forms of treatment, must come to the spring on 23 June, Sankt Hans or Midsummer's Eve. "Draw the amount of water you expect to drink in the course of the night and then direct your steps towards Helene’s grave; stretched out there, drink of the mystic health-giving water, and when the morning light has finally dawned afresh, you will be cured of your ills." Helene's Tomb is now a rectangular, grazed area surrounded by low stone fences. The two boulders leaning against each other indicate Helene's Tomb. It is located at Sankt Helenevej, 3220 Tisvildeleje.

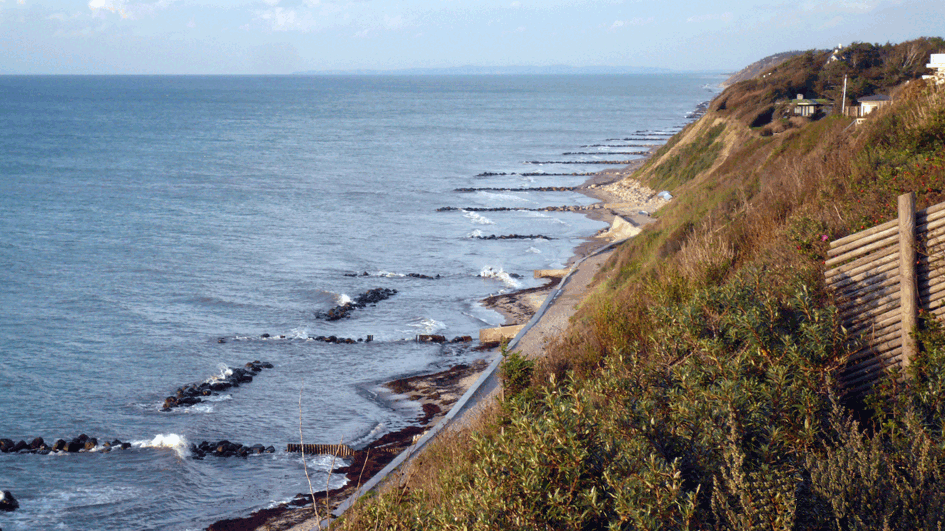
Looking easterly towards Rageleje (Scania in distant background)

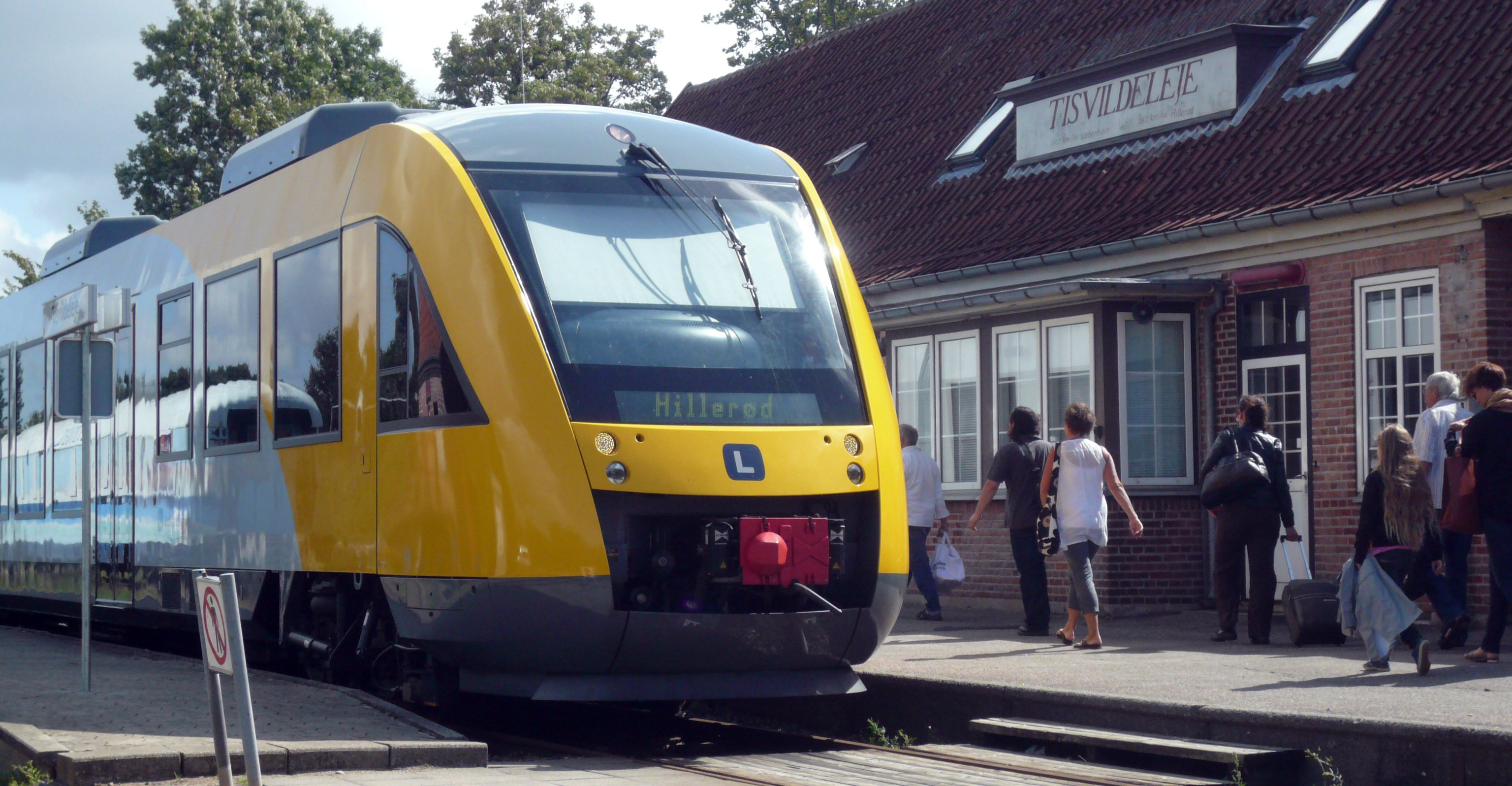
Tisvildeleje railway station

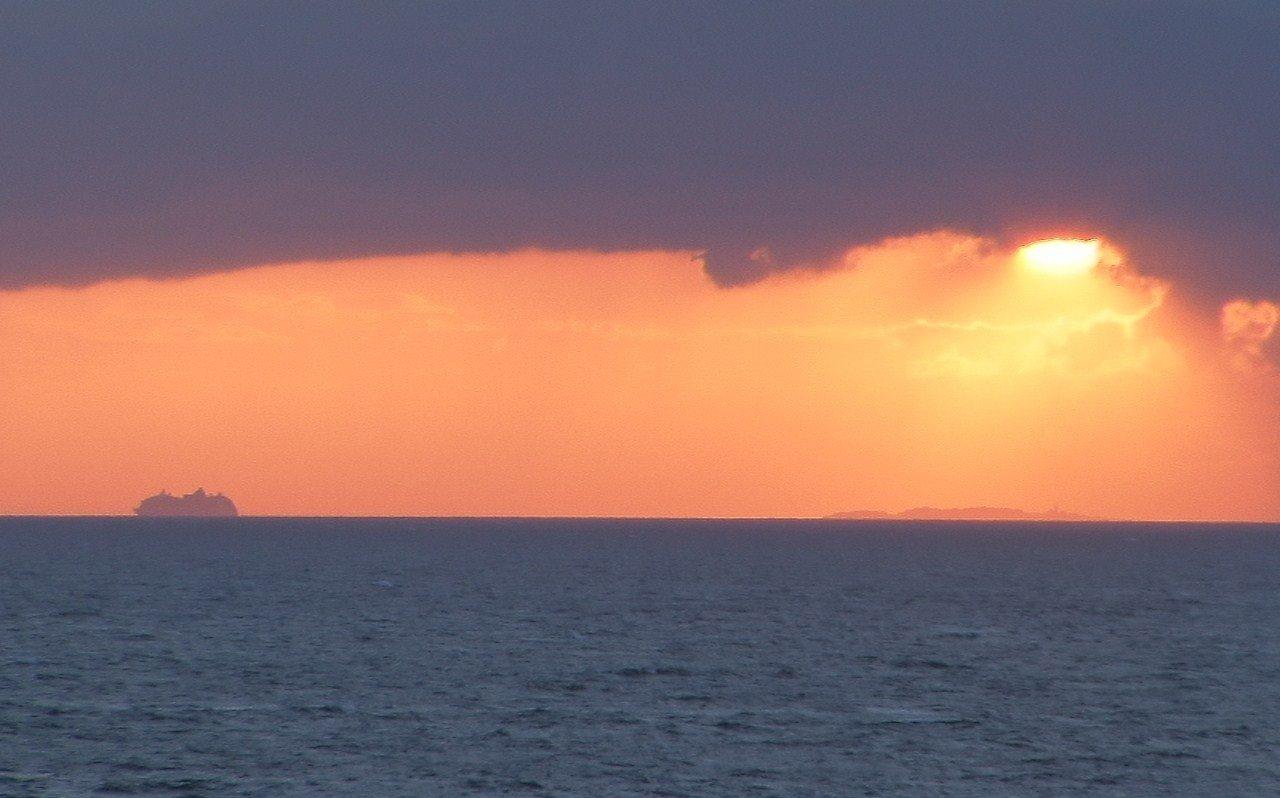
Hesselø Island and DFDS ferry to Oslo

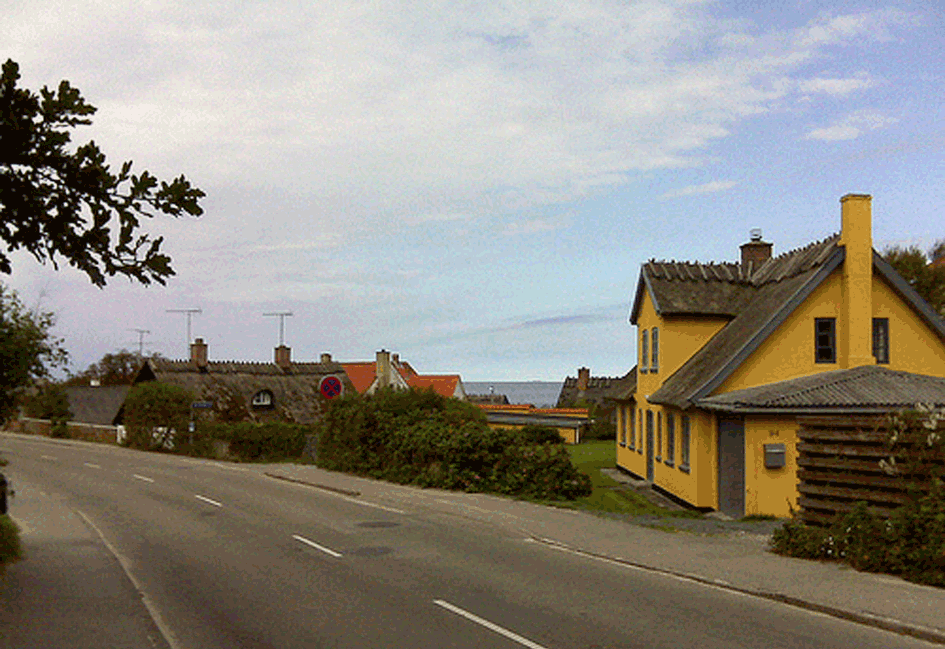

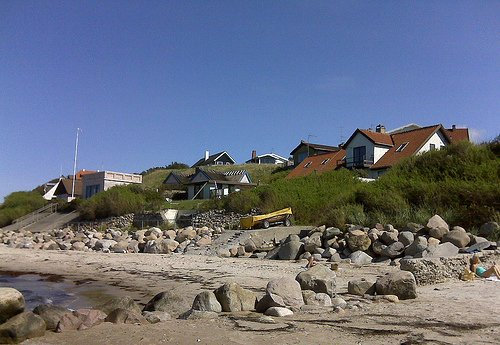

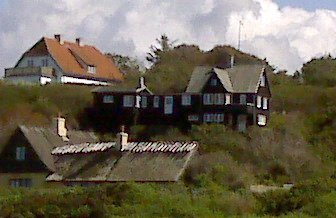

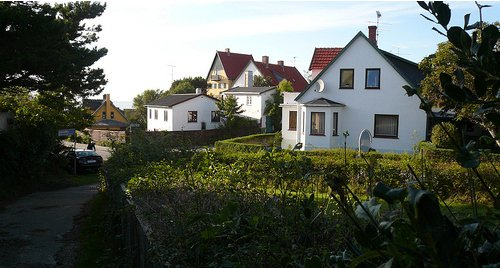

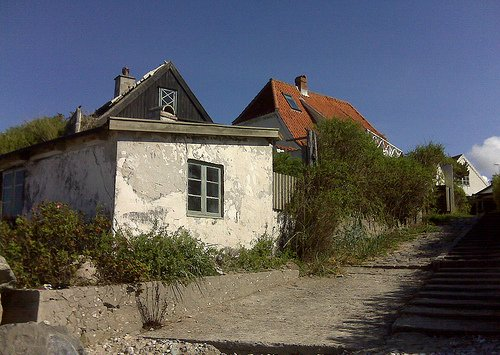

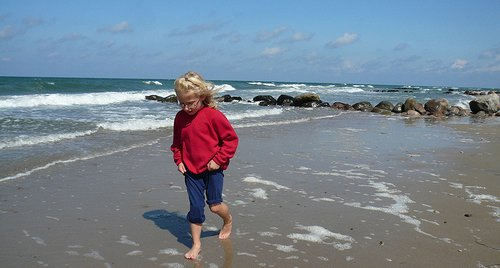

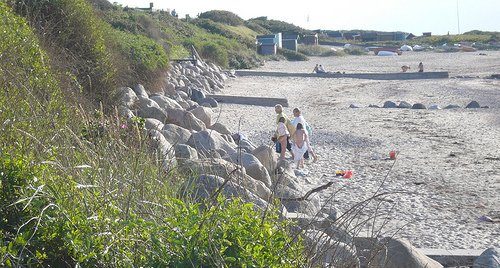

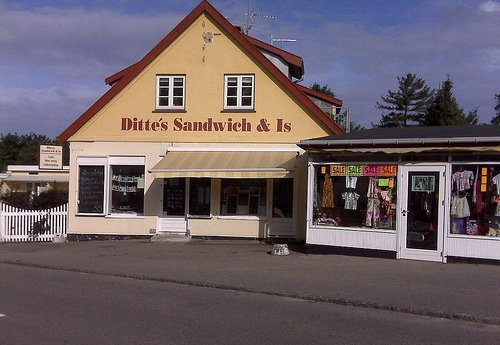

== Sources ==
- Domino Helena Old writings about Tisvilde (in Danish) accessdate = 2012-01-16
