= Græsted =

- Town
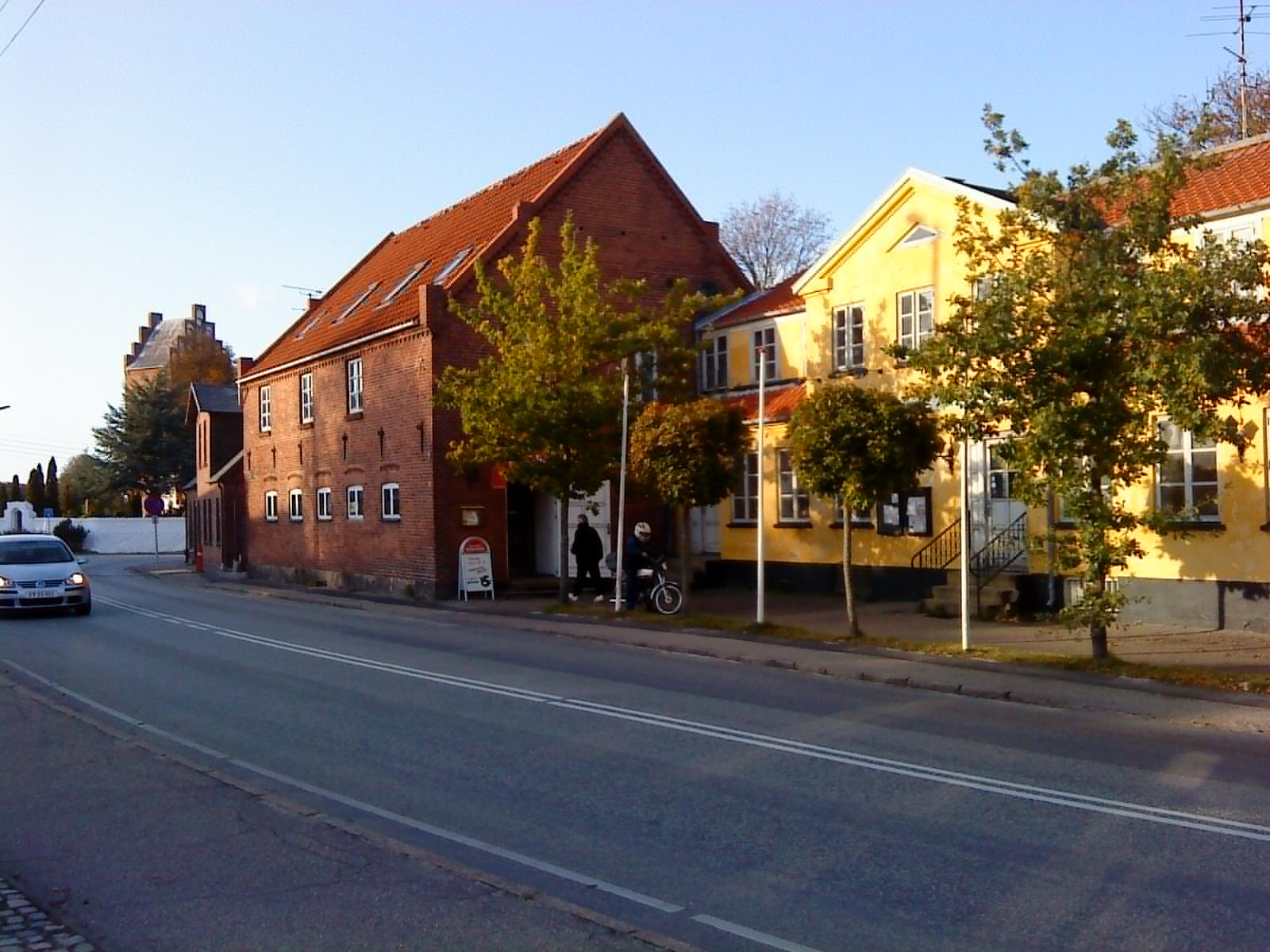

- Location in Denmark Græsted (Capital Region)
- Coordinates: 56°04′N 12°17′E
- Country: Denmark
- Region: Capital (Hovedstaden)
- Municipality: Gribskov

Area
  - Urban: 1.9 km^{2} (0.73 sq mi)

Population (2026)
  - Urban: 3,596
  - Urban density: 1,900/km^{2} (4,900/sq mi)
- Time zone: UTC+1 (CET)
  - Summer (DST): UTC+2 (CEST)

Græsted is one of the main towns of the Gribskov municipality in the Danish Region Hovedstaden. The town is in northern Sjælland, just south of Gilleleje, and has a population of 3,596 (1 January 2026). The whole of Græsted Parish had 4769 inhabitants (2004).

== History ==
Græsted's original name was Gresholdt, which means a place with grass and forest. Gresholdt is mentioned for the first time in Esrum Klosterbog in 1299. The area then belonged to Holbo Herred.

On 20 January 1880, the railroad between Græsted and Hillerød was inaugurated. This meant that development of the city escalated, with the construction of a post office, supply association, cooperative dairy, cooperative bakery and mill, as well as savings banks and industry. Græsted was for years the leading town in the area.

== Transport ==
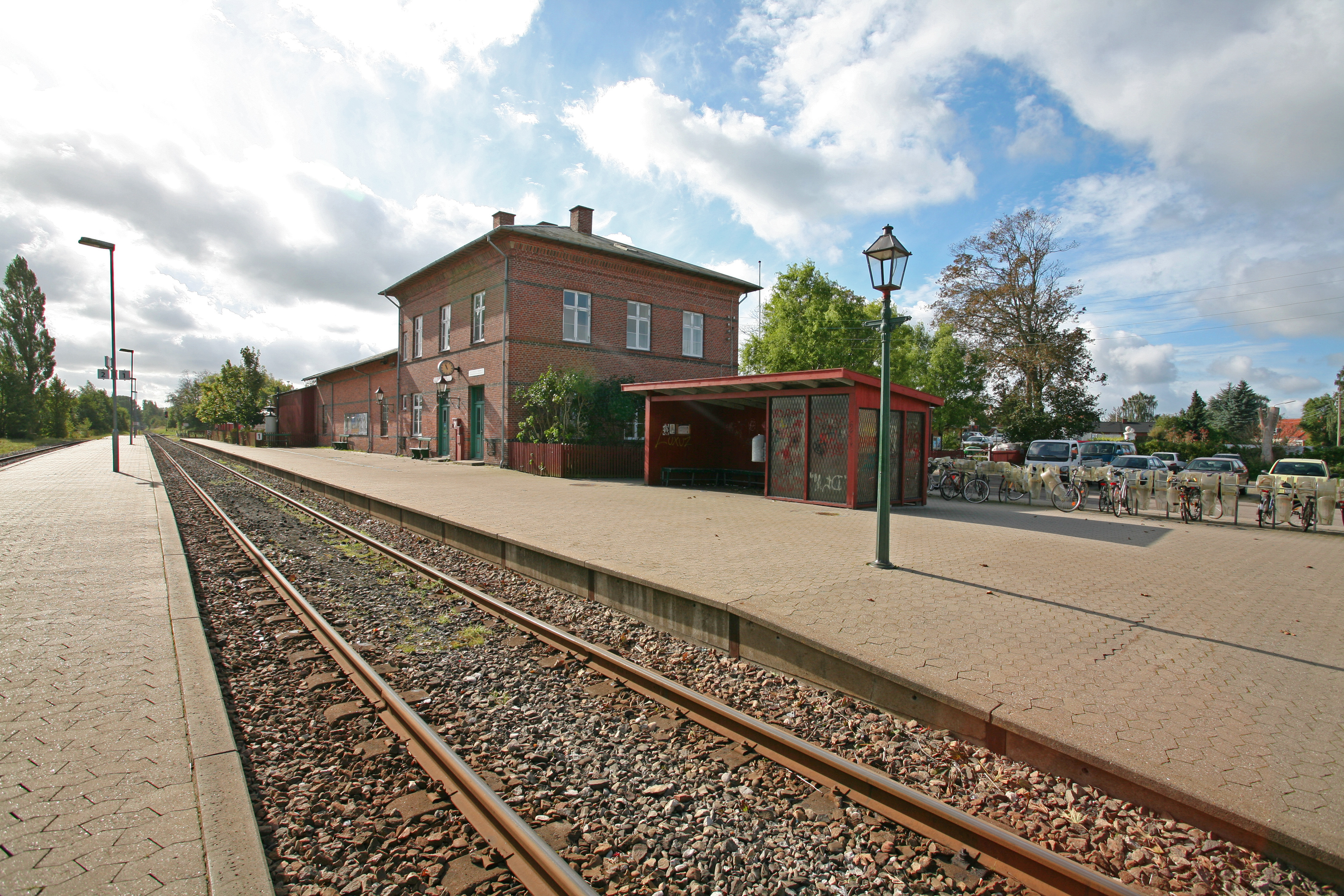
Græsted railway station

Græsted is served by Græsted railway station, located on the Gribskov railway line. The southern part of the town is served by the railway halt Græsted South.

== Notable residents of Græsted ==
- Aksel C. Wiin-Nielsen (1924–2010) Founder of the European Centre for Medium-Range Weather Forecasts; Director General of the World Meteorological Organization from 1980 to 1984
- Lars Løkke Rasmussen (born 1964) former Prime Minister of Denmark 2015–2019
- Sólrun Løkke Rasmussen (born 1968) city council member for Græsted-Gilleleje from 1998 to 2005, wife of Lars Løkke Rasmussen

== See also ==
- Holbo Herred
