= Helsinge =

- Town
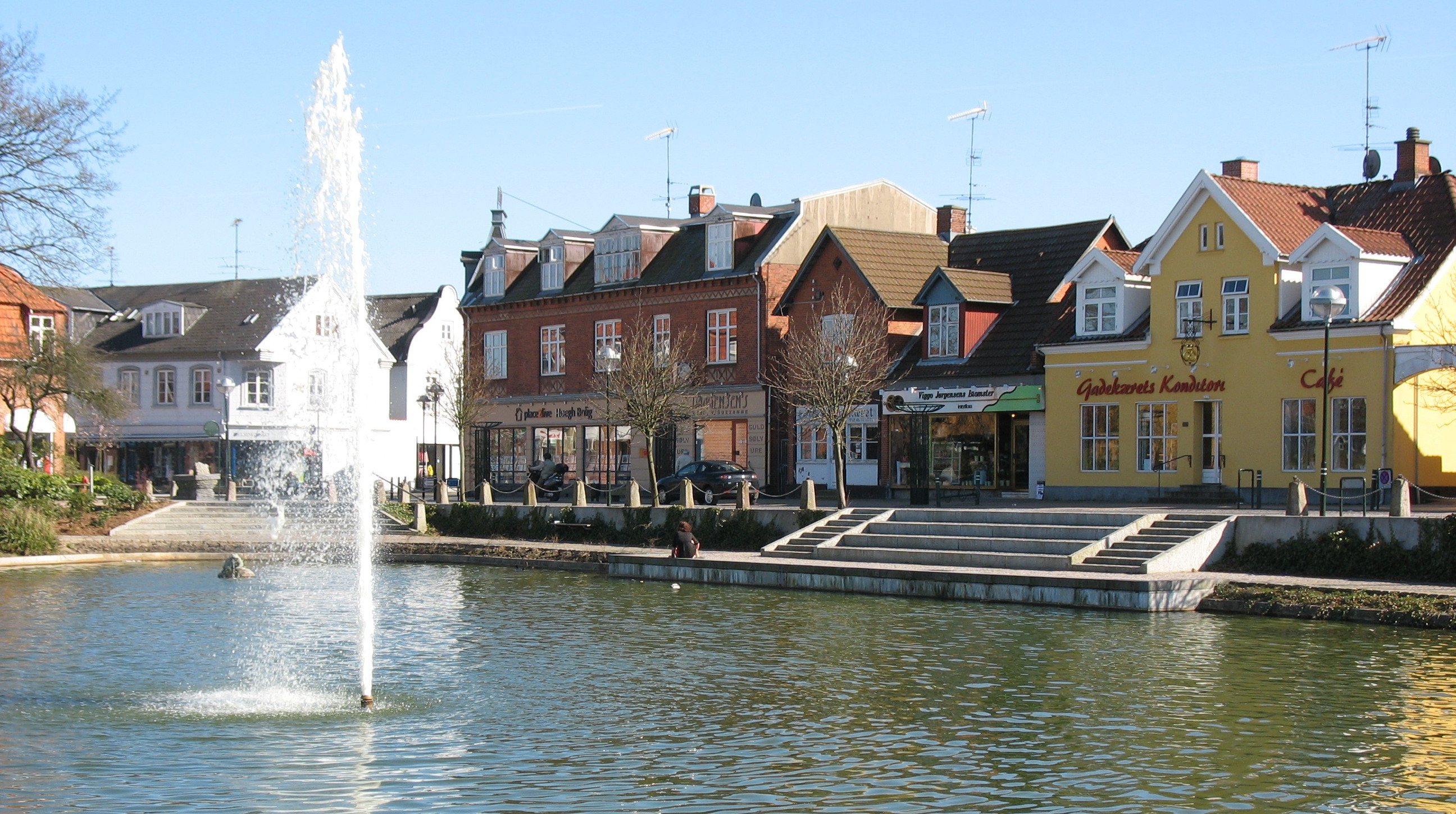
- The central pond in Helsinge

- Location in Denmark Helsinge (Capital Region)
- Coordinates: 56°1′20″N 12°11′50″E
- Country: Denmark
- Region: Region Hovedstaden
- Municipality: Gribskov Municipality

Area
  - Urban: 5.6 km^{2} (2.2 sq mi)

Population (2026)
  - Urban: 9,853
  - Urban density: 1,800/km^{2} (4,600/sq mi)
  - Gender: 4,687 males and 5,166 females
- Time zone: UTC+1 (CET)
  - Summer (DST): UTC+2 (CEST)
- Postal code: DK-3200 Helsinge

Helsinge is a town in North Zealand, Denmark. As of 1 January 2026, it has a population of 9,853. It is the municipal seat of Gribskov Municipality in Region Hovedstaden.

== History ==
In 1682, the village of Helsinge included 10 farms and 12 houses without land. The total cultivated area was 312.8 barrels of land.

In early 19th century, Helsinge was as small as the neighbouring villages, but it had an inn and a church and the vicar had another parish under him, Valby. Through the 19th century Helsinge grew. In 1840 23% of the 1258 inhabitants in the parish lived in the city, but in 1901 the percentage was 43% of 1647. In the meantime the town had got among other things both a judge (1848), a doctor (1859), a post office (1863), telegraphy (1872) and a railway station (1897).

== Sport ==
The local handball club Nordsjælland Håndbold plays in the top Danish division.

== Notable people ==
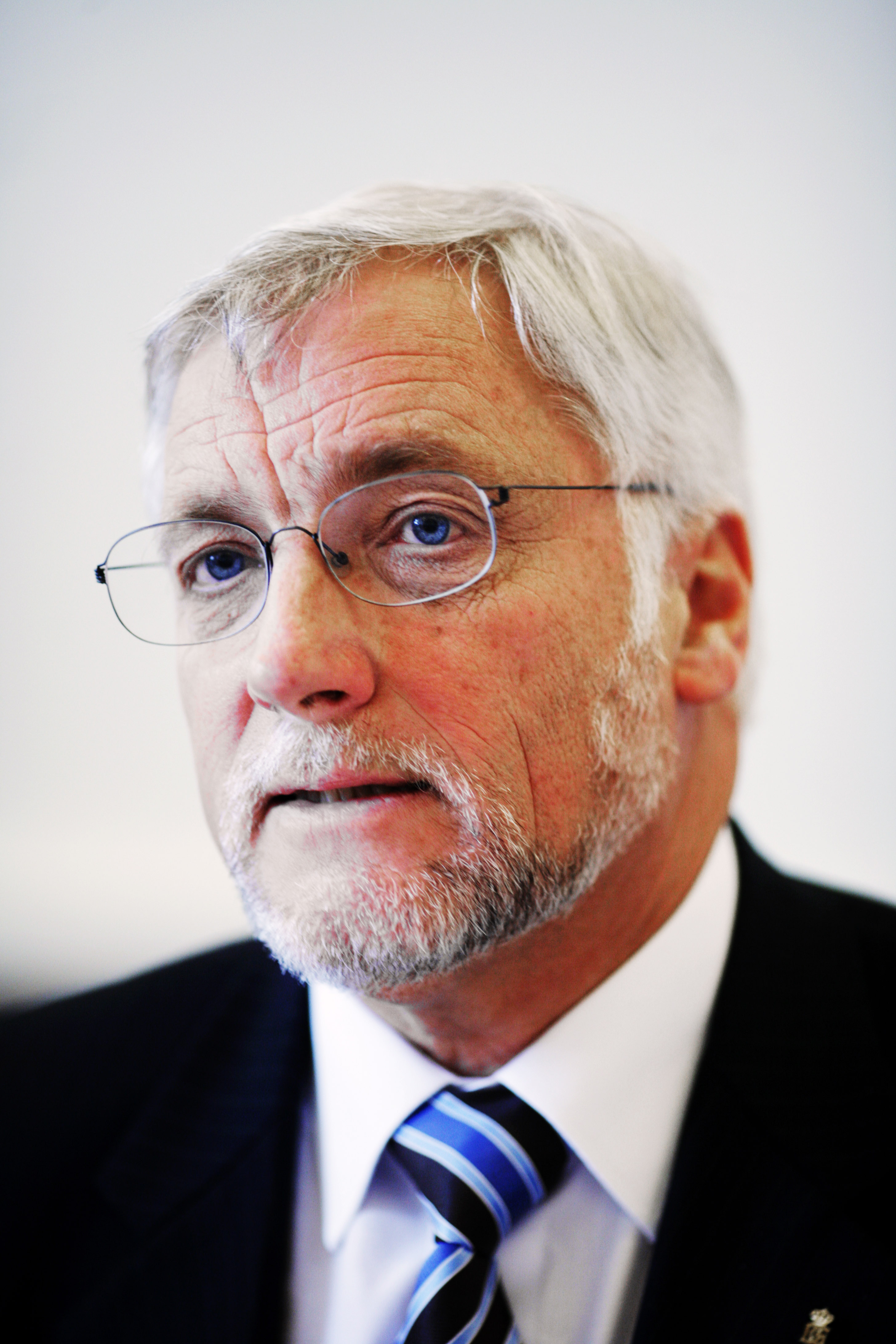
Thor Pedersen, 2006

- Christiern Pedersen (c.1480 – 1554 in Helsinge) a canon, humanist scholar, writer, printer and publisher
- Jens Poul Andersen (1844 in Huseby, near Annisse – 1935) an inventor, constructed cameras
- Niels Fennet (born 1944 in Valby, near Helsinge) an engineer and businessman, founded Cabinn Hotels
- Thor Pedersen (born 1945) politician, member of Helsinge Municipal Council 1974-1986, Mayor 1978-1986, member of Folketinget & Government Minister.
- Bente Hammer (born 1950) a textile artist and fashion designer, moved to Bornholm in 1987
- Anders Bircow (born 1951) a Danish actor and comedian
- Yuko Takada Keller (born 1958) an artist, curator and essayist based in Helsinge since 1997
- Christian Brøns (born 1977 in Kagerup, near Helsinge) a Danish singer

=== Sport ===
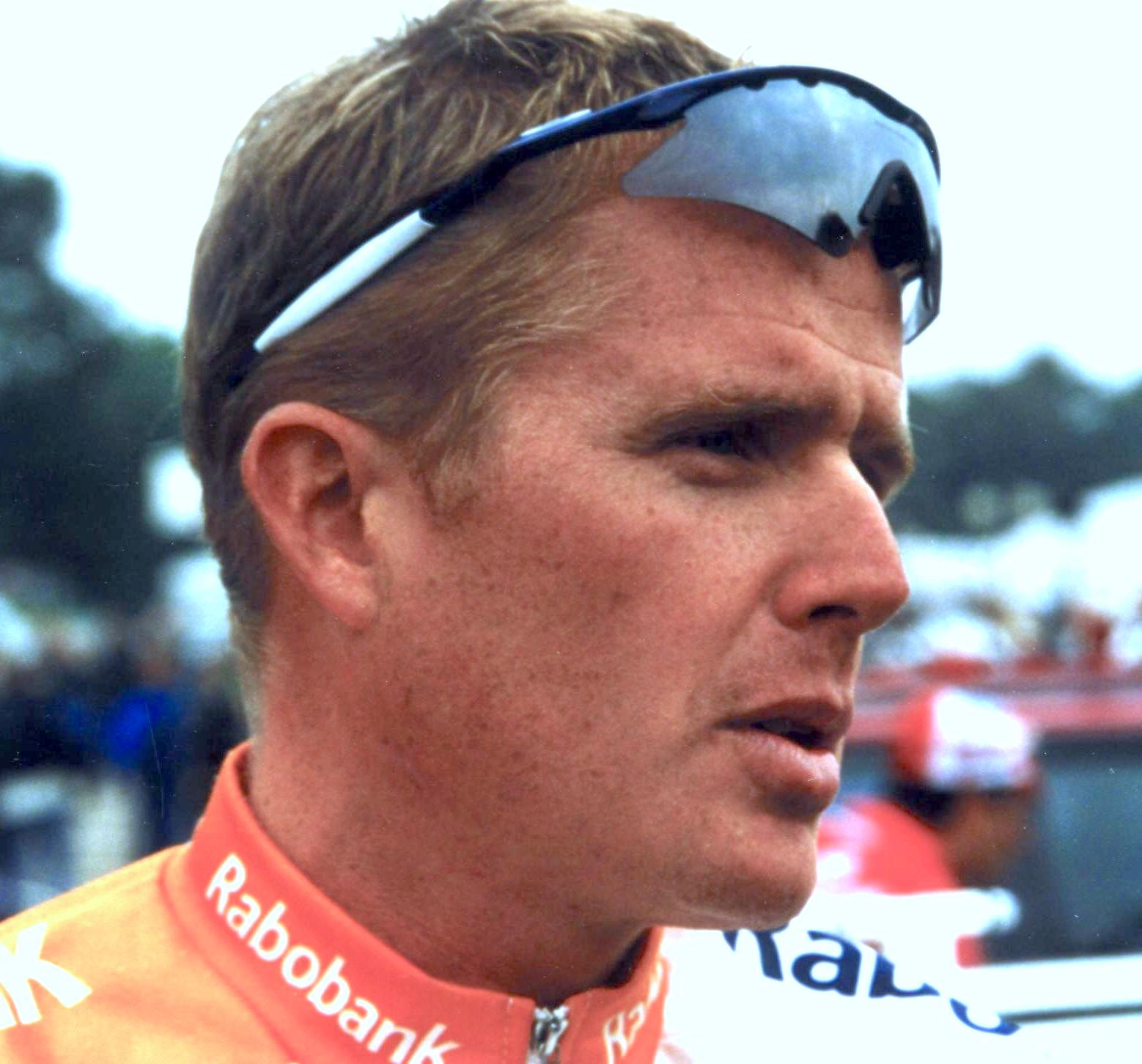
Rolf Sørensen, 1998

- Rolf Sørensen (born 1965) a former Danish professional road bicycle racer, silver medallist at the 1996 Summer Olympics, now a cycling commentator and agent
- Poul-Erik Høyer Larsen (born 1965) a retired Danish badminton player and President of the Badminton World Federation
- Morten Petersen (born 1978) a Danish retired footballer, over 200 caps for Lyngby Boldklub
- Nikolaj Markussen (born 1988) a Danish handballer who plays for Bjerringbro-Silkeborg
- Sandra Toft (born 1989) a Danish handball goalkeeper

== International relations ==
=== Twin towns — Sister cities ===
Helsinge is twinned with:

- Lubsko, Poland

== Bibliography ==
- Ethelberg, Hans (2001). En landsby i vækst (in Danish). Helsinge Lokalhistoriske Arkiv. ISBN 87-988681-0-1.
- Nielsen, N. Th. (1945). Helsingebogen (in Danish). C. Nordlundes Bogtrykkeri.
- Pedersen, Henrik (1928). De danske Landbrug fremstillet paa Grundlag af Forarbejderne til Christian V.s Matrikel 1688 (in Danish). Copenhagen.
