= Hillerød railway station =

Railway station in Hillerød, Denmark

Hillerød
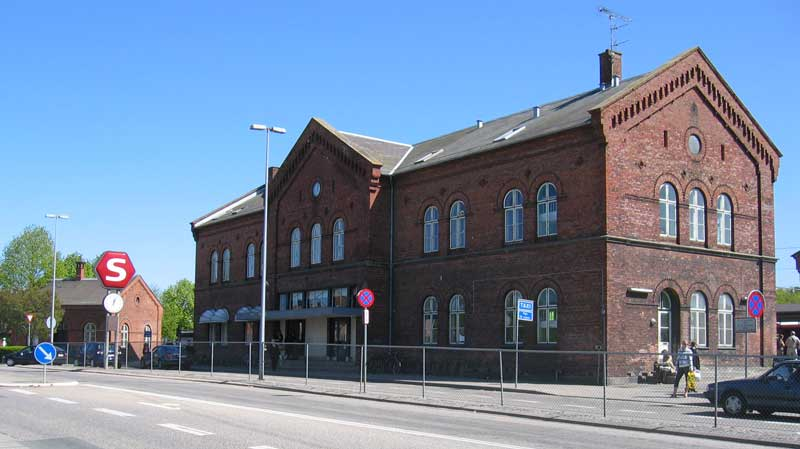
- Front facade of Hillerød station

General information
- Location: Nordre Jernbanevej 37; 3400 Hillerød; Hillerød Municipality; Denmark
- Coordinates: 55°55′37″N 12°18′39″E
- Elevation: 36.9 metres (121 ft)
- Owner: DSB (station infrastructure); Banedanmark (rail infrastructure)
- Lines: North Line; Little North Line; Gribskov Line; Frederiksværk Line
- Platforms: 6
- Tracks: 9
- Train operators: DSB; Lokaltog

History
- Opened: 8 June 1864

Services
Preceding station	S-train	Following station
Terminus	A	Favrholm towards Hundige
Terminus	A Sat–Sun	Favrholm towards Køge
Preceding station	Lokaltog	Following station
Terminus	Frederiksværk Line Local train	Favrholm towards Hundested Harbour
Slotspavillonen towards Tisvildeleje	Gribskov Line Tisvildeleje branch	Terminus
Slotspavillonen towards Gilleleje	Gribskov Line Gilleleje branch	Terminus
Grønholt towards Helsingør	Little North Line Local train	Terminus
Location

Hillerød station (Danish pronunciation: [ˈhiləˌʁœðˀ stæˈɕoˀn]) is a railway station serving the city of Hillerød north of Copenhagen, Denmark.

It is the terminus of four railways lines:

- An S-train line (Nordbanen) from Copenhagen, operated by DSB
- Frederiksværkbanen, operated by Lokaltog
- Gribskovbanen, operated by Lokaltog
- Lille Nord towards Helsingør, operated by Lokaltog

Though there are track connections between the four railways, they are rarely used. Each has its own dedicated dead-end platform tracks.

The bus terminal in front of the station is a major hub for transportation throughout northeastern Zealand.

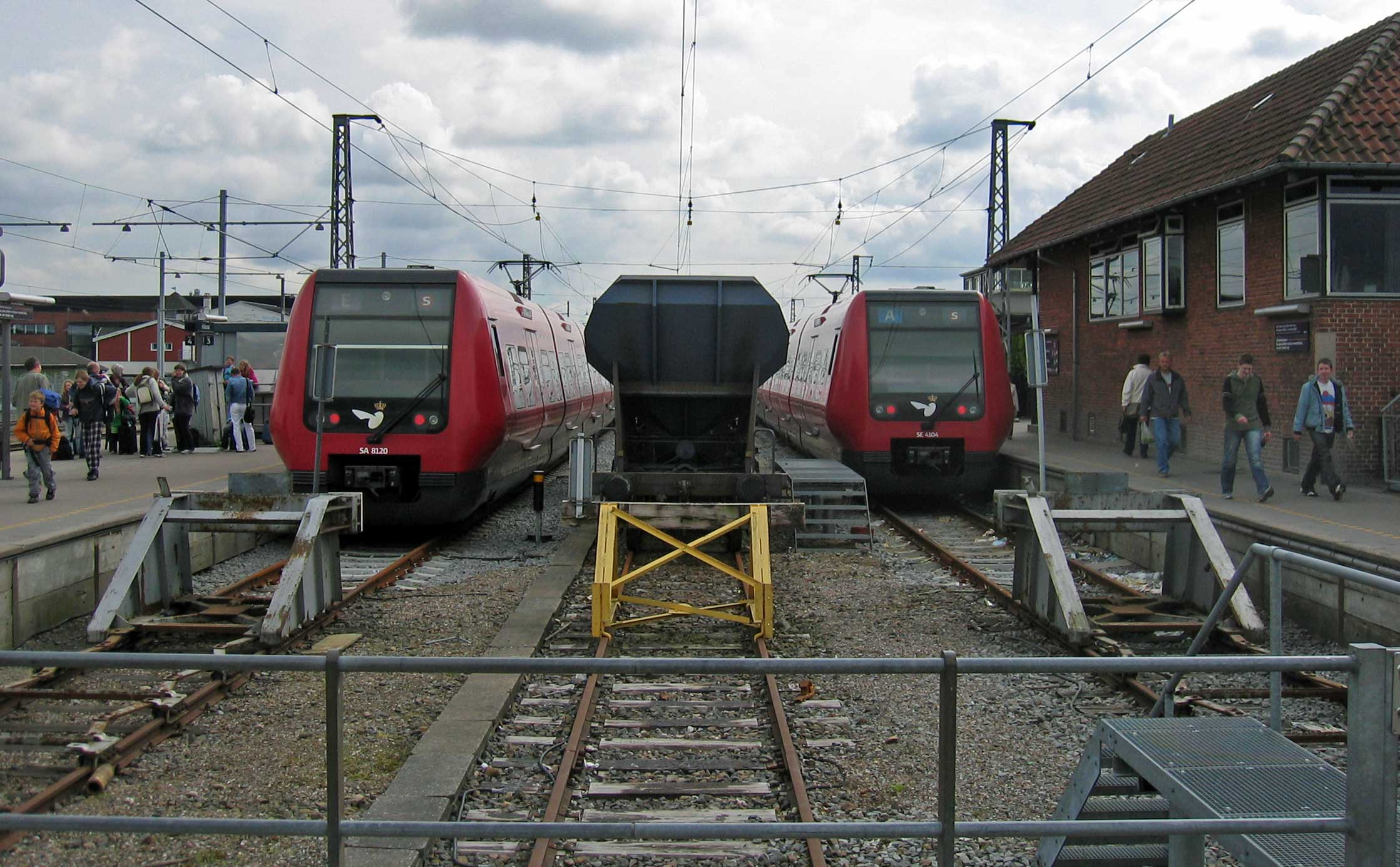
The end of the line

== See also ==
- List of Copenhagen S-train stations
- List of railway stations in Denmark
