= Mørk =

Mørk is a Norwegian or Danish surname. The name may refer to:

- Edward Mørk (1888–1926), Norwegian trade unionist and politician
- Erik Mørk (1925–1993), Danish film actor
- Lene Mørk (born 1979), Danish badminton player
- Marie Mørk (1861–1944), Danish school founder
- Nora Mørk (born 1991), Norwegian professional handball player
- Ole Mørk (born 1948), Danish professional football player and manager
- Torbjørn Mork (1928–1992), Norwegian physician and civil servant
- Truls Mørk (born 1961), Norwegian cellist

See also

- Mork (disambiguation)
