= Gribskov =

Forest in Denmark

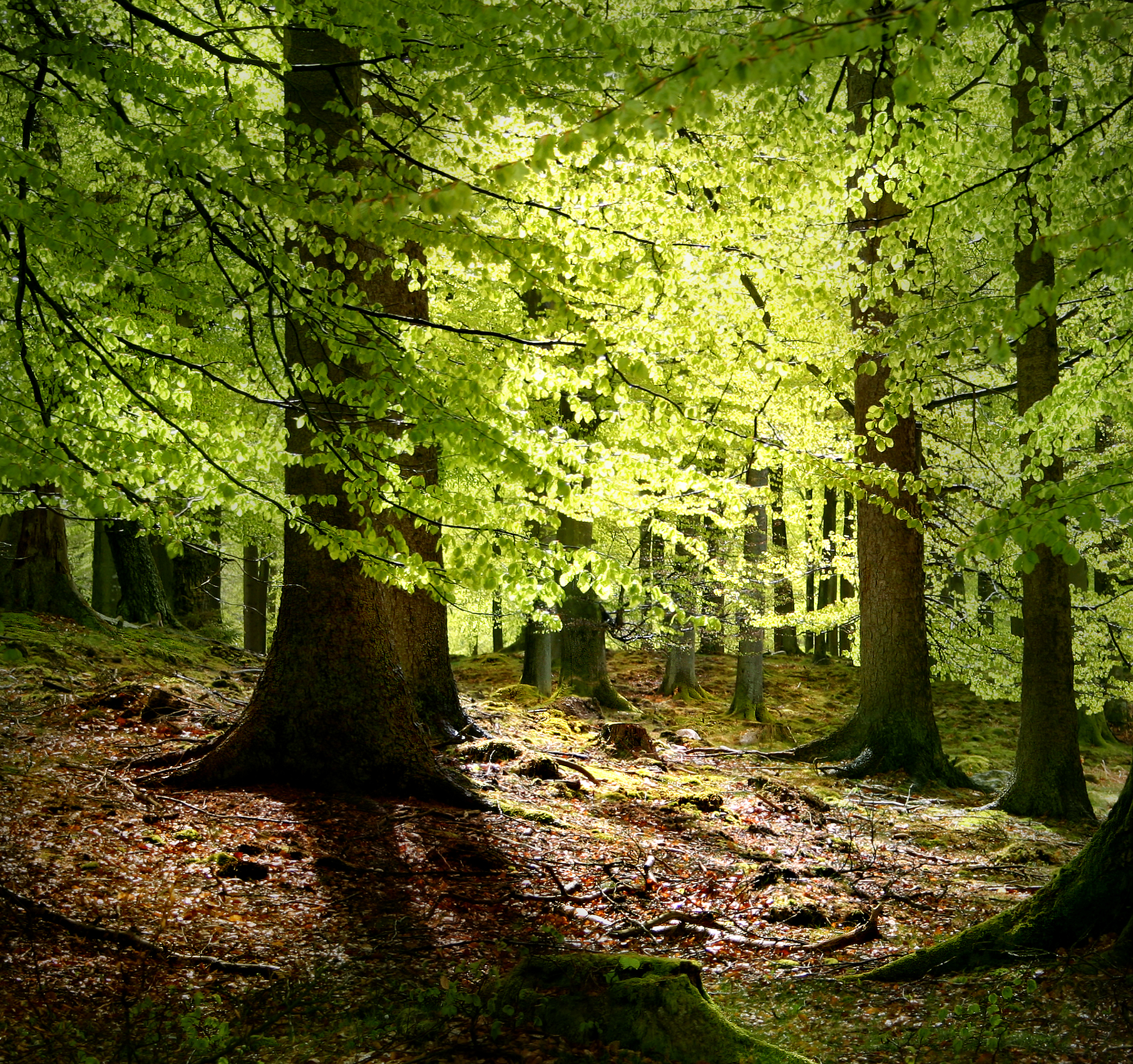
- Old beech trees in Gribskov.

- Location within Denmark
- Interactive map of Gribskov

Geography
- Location: Hillerød, Helsinge, Fredensborg, Denmark
- Coordinates: 55°59′N 12°18′E
- Area: 56 km^{2} (22 sq mi)

Ecology
- WWF Classification: Baltic mixed forests

Gribskov (Grib Forest) is Denmark's fourth largest forest, comprising c. 5,600 ha of woodland situated in northern Zealand, west and south of Lake Esrum. The forest is owned and administered by the State of Denmark, and a part of the Kongernes Nordsjælland National Park. In July 2015, it was one of three forests included in a UNESCO World Heritage Site, the Par force hunting landscape in North Zealand.

Gribskov is usually divided into four sections: The northwest surrounding the small village of Maarum, the northeast on the banks of Lake Esrum, the southwest around the small lake of Gribsø and finally the southeast, enclosing the village of Nødebo on the southern banks of Lake Esrum.

Only a thin strip of Hillerød town in the south separates Gribskov from many larger woodlands such as Store Dyrehave at 1,100 ha, Tokkekøb Hegn at 631 ha and several smaller woods.

== Etymology ==
The Danish name Gribskov translates literally as Grib forest in English. The first part, 'grib', is the imperative form of the verb for 'catch' or 'grab', but the actual meaning and etymology of the word go a bit deeper. 'Grib' refers to the Old Danish word for something 'without any specific owner', so 'Gribskov' actually means a woodland of common ownership.

== Nature ==
Gribskov and Lake Esrum are designated as EU habitat directive and Natura 2000 areas, as part of an even larger preserve. On top of that, Gribskov is designated as an Important Bird Area (IBA). Around 20% or c. 1,200 ha of the forest has been reserved as 'forest to be untouched', in an effort to preserve some of the few spots of semi-natural woodland (SNW) in Denmark and stimulate the growth of new.

The birdlife in Gribskov is varied and of international importance. The forest is home to the largest populations of common goldeneye, green sandpiper and red-backed shrike in Denmark and near Nødebo at Lake Esrum, a noisy colony of great cormorants has found a home. Cormorants can be a problematic bird to administer locally, but they are protected in Denmark and on list III in the Berne convention.

The forest grows in a hilly terrain (by Danish standards), with lower lying areas in the east and west. The low-lying areas are dominated by beech and oak, but with several forest types mixed in, such as wood pastures or old coppice woodland with alder and ash. There are also numerous small ponds, bogs, swamps and springs, some enshrouded by myths, superstition or old folk tales.

Gribskov is more than 10,000 years old, dating from the end of the last ice age, but the forest bears the marks of an intensive plantation industry that accelerated from the late 1700s and peaked in the 1800s. Former wetlands were drained and many new tree species were introduced, especially European spruce. These practises have now stopped in Gribskov. Artificial ditches are being filled to allow a more natural waterflow and the spruce plantations are cut down, to be naturally and quickly replaced by alder, birch and willow in coming years. It is expected that Gribskov will comprise more semi-natural woodland of deciduous trees in the future.

The forest of Gribskov offers a rare opportunity to observe free roaming deer of all the four species living in Denmark; namely the roe deer, sika deer, red deer and fallow deer, with roe and fallow deer being most common in Gribskov. Roe deer have lived here for as long as the forest itself, while fallow deer were introduced at some point during the Middle Ages. The fallow deer population in Gribskov is the largest free roaming fallow deer population in Denmark, at 600-800 animals.

=== Lakes, ponds and wetlands ===
There has been a long tradition of surface water draining by ditch-digging and natural waterflow regulation in Gribskov for various reasons, but these practises have now ceased and work is in progress to re-establish a more natural waterflow and improved conditions for wetland areas. These measures have already enhanced the biological diversity and has had a direct positive influence on the living conditions for birds in the forest.

There are several interesting bodies of water in Gribskov, seen both from a scientific and a folkloristic viewpoint. Store Gribsø (Large Grib-lake), or simply Gribsø, is only a 10 ha lake, but is nevertheless the largest forest-enclosed lake in Gribskov. It is a so-called dystrophic lake and it is impossible to see the bottom in its dark waters, even though it is only 11 m deep. The lake has no outflows and it can be ice cold just beneath the surface, so care should be taken when bathing. Tradition says the lake is bottomless and was created when God angrily punished a nunnery that once was here. The nuns showed more interest in the monks at Esrum Abbey than in God, so he opened up the ground and the chasm swallowed up all the nuns and the entire monastery. The monastery continued to sink and sink and that was how the lake was created. It is said that one can still hear the monastery's bells ringing down in the lake on quiet evenings.

== Landmarks and structures ==
There are many small ponds, streams and lakes throughout Gribskov, but the larger ones—Store Gribsø, Solbjerg Engsø and Strødam Engsø—all are situated in the southwestern parts. The latter two are the largest and attract a rich birdlife, but they are both on the edge of the forest.

The most prominent landmark is perhaps Svenskegrøften (lit.: The Swedish Ditch) initiated in 1576. It is a 2–3 km long artificial canal, winding its way through the forest from the lake of Store Gribsø and south towards the settlement of Gadevang in the southeastern section. As the name implies, Swedish prisoners of war were used for this large project, ordered by King Frederik II. The ditch is just one part of a larger network of ditches dug since the middle ages, to supply the Frederiksborg Palace with running water, to exploit the water resource for watermills in earlier times and to drain the wetlands so the land could be used for plantations. There are an estimated 526 km of artificial ditches in Gribskov.

=== Pre-history ===
There are several relics of the past in Gribskov. One example is the megalithic passage grave just outside Kagerup, a village south of Maarum in the northwest of the forest. It was raised at some point in the neolithic Stone Age, about 5–6,000 years ago and is referred to as Jættestuen, simply meaning The Passage Grave in English. Not far from the megalithic tomb are two round dolmens, one of which is heavily deteriorated. Another megalithic passage grave is situated in the southwestern part of the woods. This tomb is known as Mor Gribs Hule (lit.: Mother Grib's Lair) and of similar age and origin as Jættestuen. Tradition says that the notorious sorceress Mother Grib lived in the grave chamber. She used to whistle at wayfarers, leading them astray to be robbed and killed by her sons This story gives an entirely new meaning to the name of Gribskov.

Just northwest of Gribskov, the small woodland of Valby Hegn holds a total of seven long barrows from the neolithic.

=== Buildings ===
Gribskov is cut through by the Gribskov Line, an old railway line laid out in 1878, then offering the urban population a first-time opportunity to visit the forests.

Near the village of Nødebo at Lake Esrum in the southeastern part of the forest is Skovskolen (lit.: The Forest School), a large school situated in the old foresters lodge, Skovfryd (lit.: Forest-joy), from 1829 to 1830. Here forest engineers, landscape engineers and nature guides are educated.

In the northeastern corner is the old Esrum Abbey.

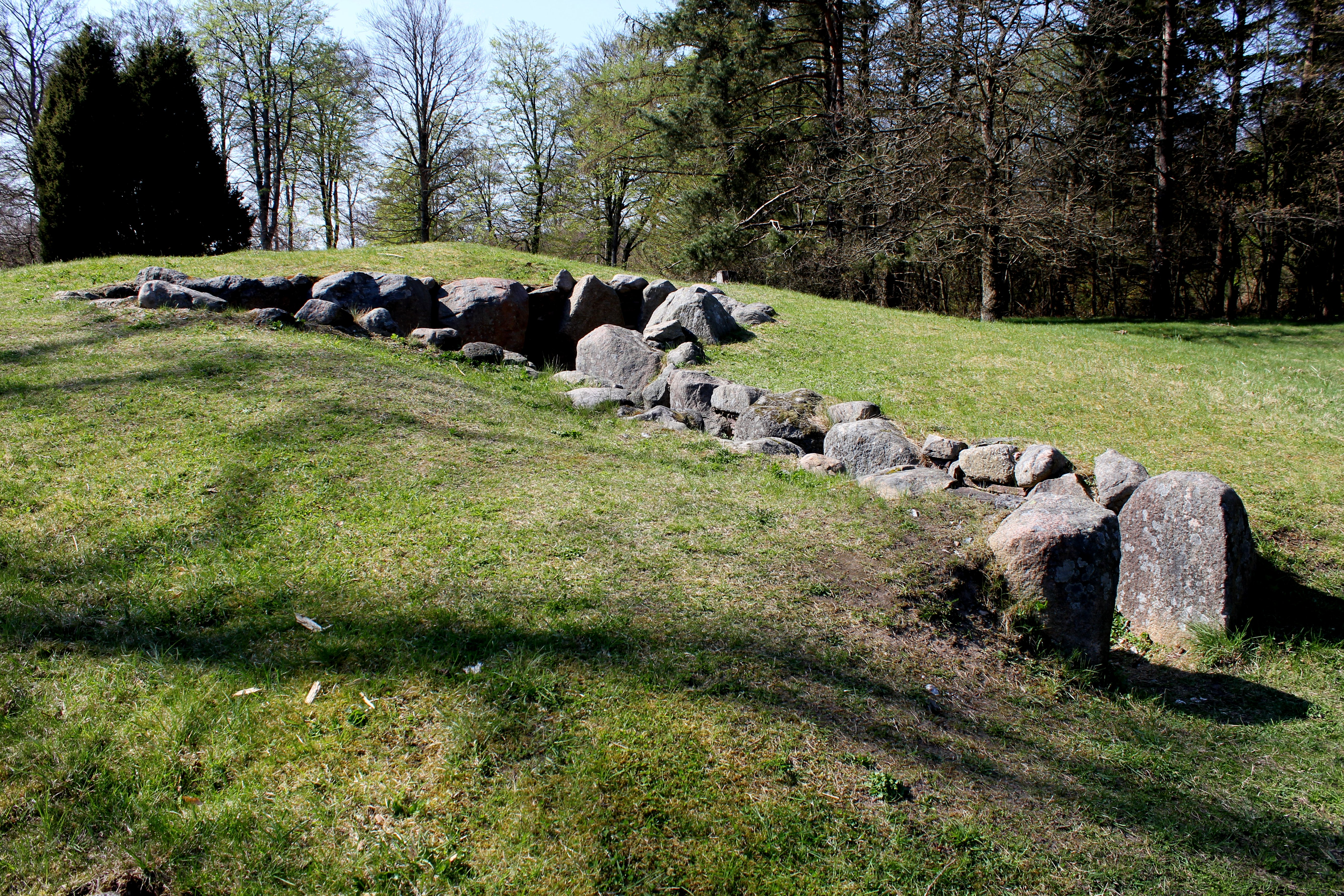
Entrance to the Stone Age passage grave of 'Mor Gribs Hule'.

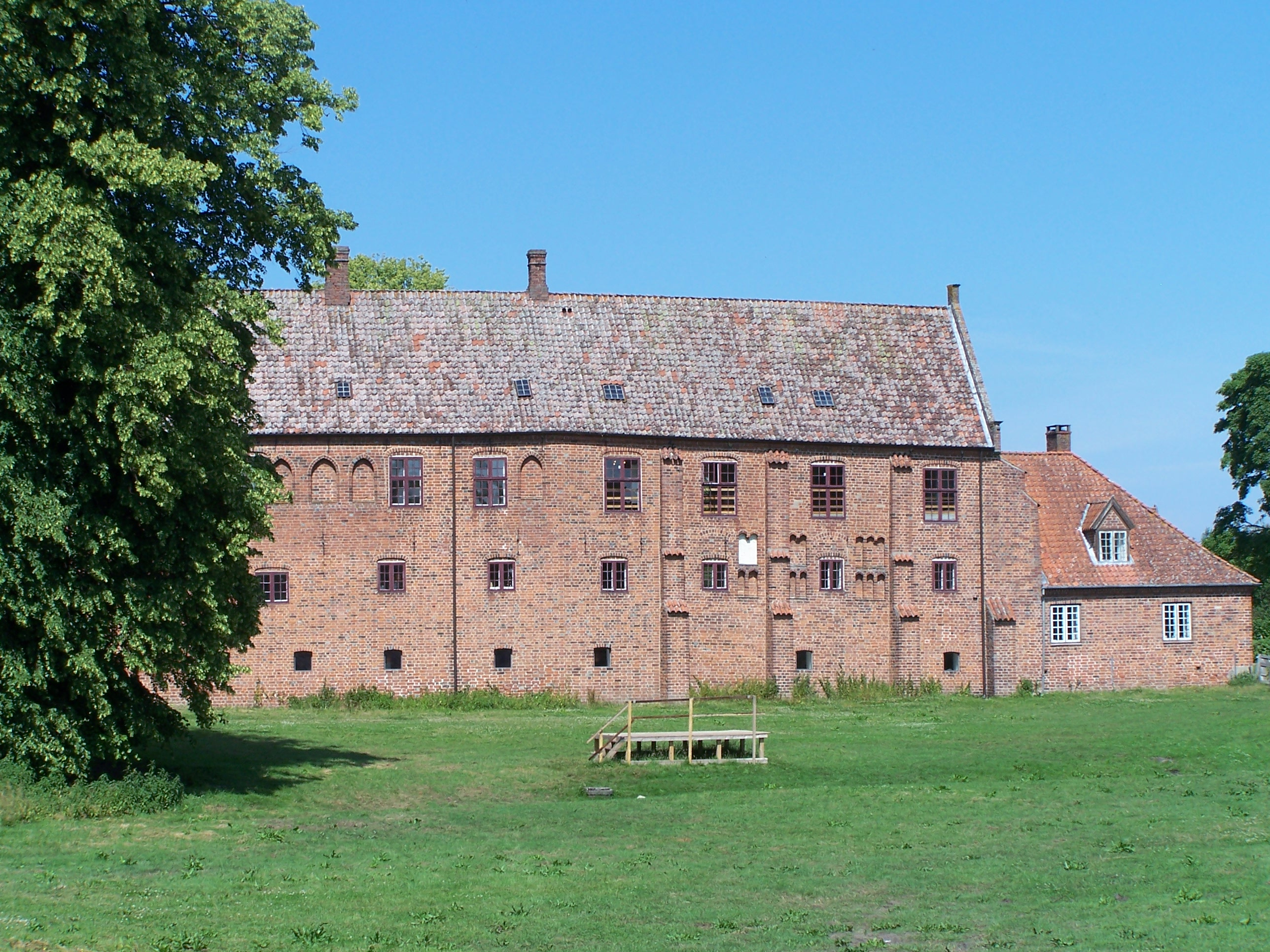
The medieval Esrom Monastery.

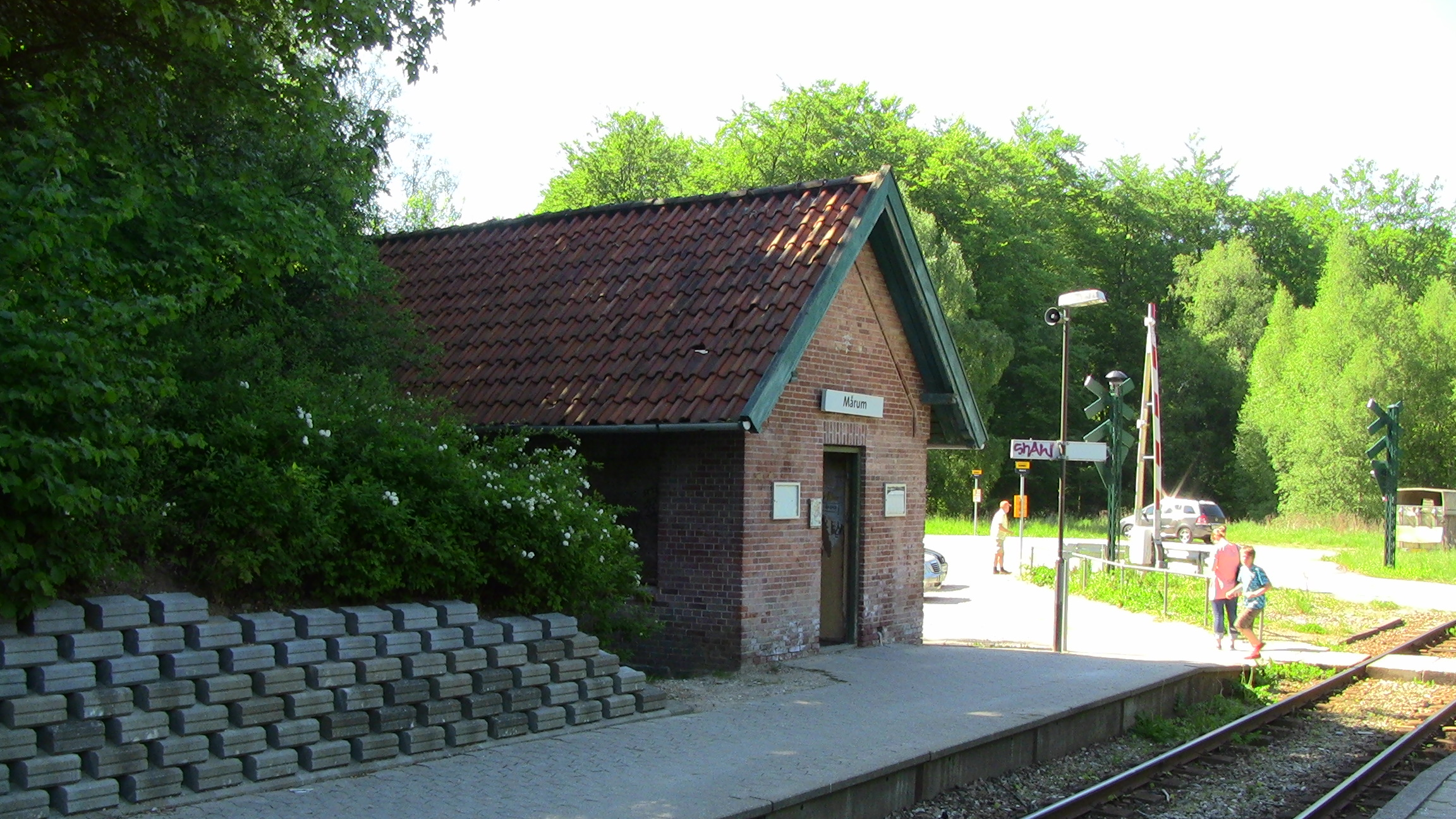
Mårum train station in the northwestern section of Gribskov.

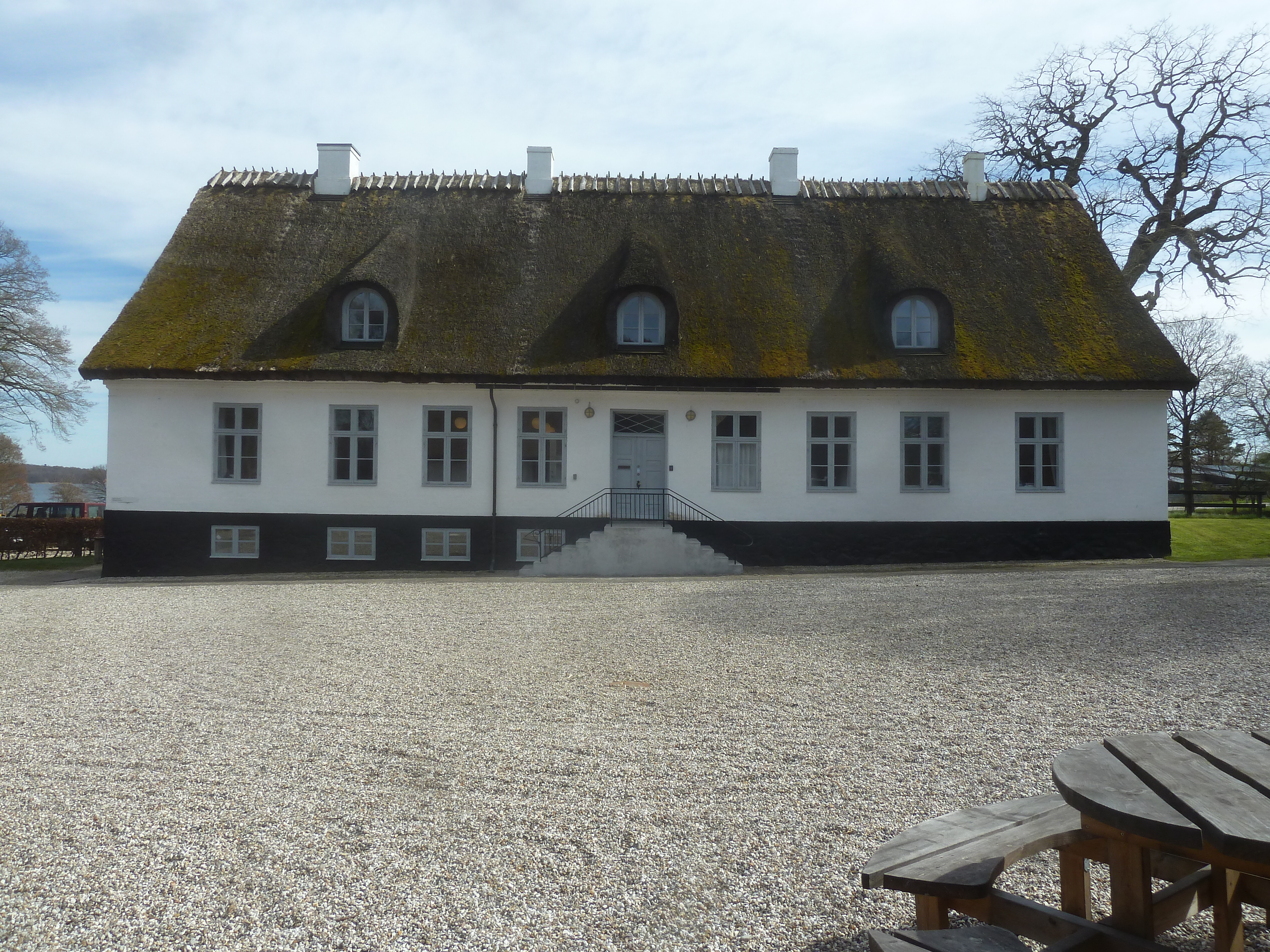
Skovskolen near Nødebo.

== Forestry and hunting ==
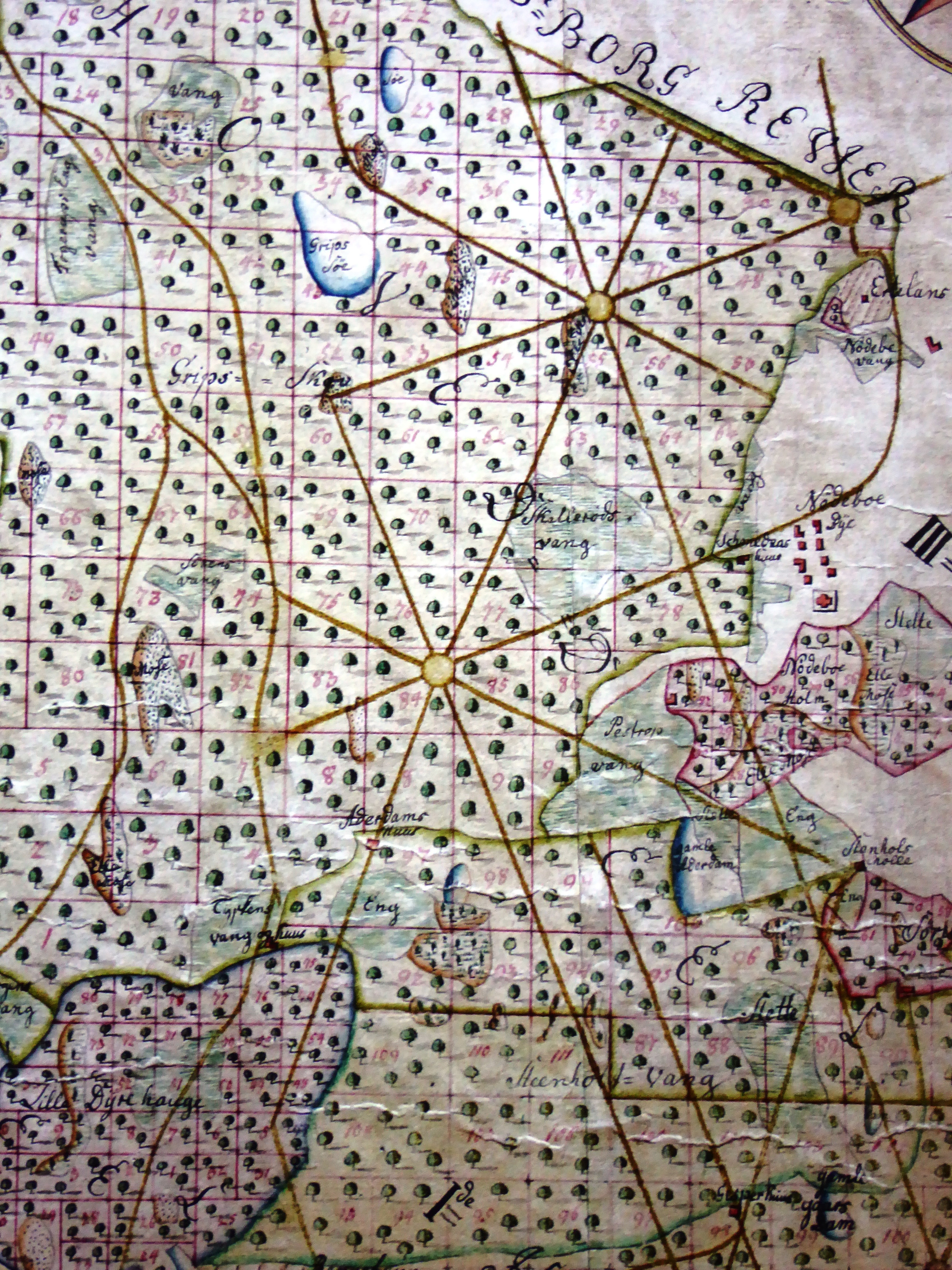
Old map of the southern parts of Gribskov, highlighting the star-patterned hunting paths specifically. Made by J.G. von Langen in the 1760s.

Gribskov has a long tradition for forestry of all kinds.

In 1736, the German forester Johann Georg von Langen participated in restoring the Danish woodlands of the time by introducing European larch. Some of the first larch trees were planted in Gribskov in 1776 and they still can be seen there today in the northwestern parts, just east of Mårum. Known as Tinghuslærkene (lit.: The Tinghus-larches), one of the trees, now marked with a yellow ring and standing 36 m tall, was picked in 1935 by the Danish forestry geneticist Carl Syrach-Larsen for hybrid experimentation. From the marked tree in Gribskov, he developed a very successful hybrid with Japanese larch, able to withstand the devastating fungal larch canker disease also known as Lachnellula willkommii. The hybrids also had a faster and healthier growth. The hybrid is known as Larix × marschlinsii or L. × eurolepis (discouraged name) and can also occur spontaneously, wherever European and Japanese larch grow together.

Nowadays parts of Gribskov are used for seed production of species such as European spruce.

The history of hunting in Gribskov also reaches far back in time. The most visible signs are perhaps the extensive path structures laid out in different parts of the forests, especially near Nødebo, in the years 1680–90 by King Christian V. These are long straight lines, usually designed in star-patterns, merging and radiating from strategical points. They were constructed and used for running up and tiring the game (usually deer) in so-called parforce hunting, by horse and packs of hunting dogs. The same kind of layout and design also can be seen in the nearby woodlands of Store Dyrehave and Jægersborg Dyrehave, just south of Gribskov. They all are former royal game reserves. Gribskov still is used for hunting today—in particular deer—and some areas are not to be disturbed, but parforce hunting is illegal and has been since the year 1777.

== See also ==
- Danish Museum of Hunting and Forestry

== Sources ==
- Flemming Rune (2009): Gribskov, Vol. 1, 2 and map-appendices, Forlaget Esrum Sø, ISBN 9788788393309. (in Danish)
- Lars Viinholt-Nielsen, Ole-Chr. M. Plum (2009): Gribskovbanen, Dansk Jernbane-Klub, ISBN 9788787050616. (in Danish)
- The Parforce Hunting landscape in North Zealand UNESCO
- Areas within Gribskov:
  - Northwest: Gribskov - Maarum Danish Nature Agency. Pdf. and map of the area. (in Danish)
  - Northeast: Gribskov - Lake Esrum Danish Nature Agency. Pdf. and map of the area. (in Danish)
  - Southwest: Gribskov - Gribsø Danish Nature Agency. Pdf. and map of the area. (in Danish)
  - Southeast: Gribskov - Nødebo Danish Nature Agency. Pdf. and map of the area. (in Danish)
