= Hans Ole Brasen =

Danish painter

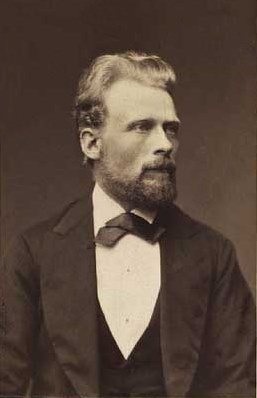
- Brasen photographed in 1872
- Born: 16 January 1849; Hillerød, Denmark
- Died: 24 February 1930 (aged 81); Copenhagen, Denmark
- Education: Royal Danish Academy of Art
- Known for: Painting

Hans Ole Brasen (16 January 1849 – 24 February 1930) was a Danish painter. He won the Eckersberg Medal in 1894.

== Biography ==
Brasen was born in Hillerød to a merchant father. His mother had painted some flower paintings as a young girl which inspired him to take up painting. In 1863, he began an apprenticeship with master painter Ernst Schmiegelow, who supported his artistic talent and helped him get into the Art Academy.

Brasen exhibited his works for the first time in 1871 and began to receive instructions from Eiler Rasmussen Eilersen with whom he travelled to Italy in 1876. In 1879, he exhibited a large painting, Guard Hussars watering their horses, which won him the Academy's travel stipend. He then set out for Northern Italy, first making a stop in Tyrol, then spending the winter in Paris where he studied under Léon Bonnat. He then returned to Tyrol where he painted some of his most successful works. In 1885, with support from Det Ancherske Legat, Brasen went on a third journey to Italy.

In 1886 he exhibited a portrait. He later spent several summers in the Sørup on the southeastern shores of Lake Esrom where he painted the washerwomen.

He was a member of Akademirådet during 1896–1914 and of Charlottenborg's Exhibition Committee from 1908–11 and again from 1914–23. Brasen received the Eckersberg Medal in 1894.

== Image gallery ==
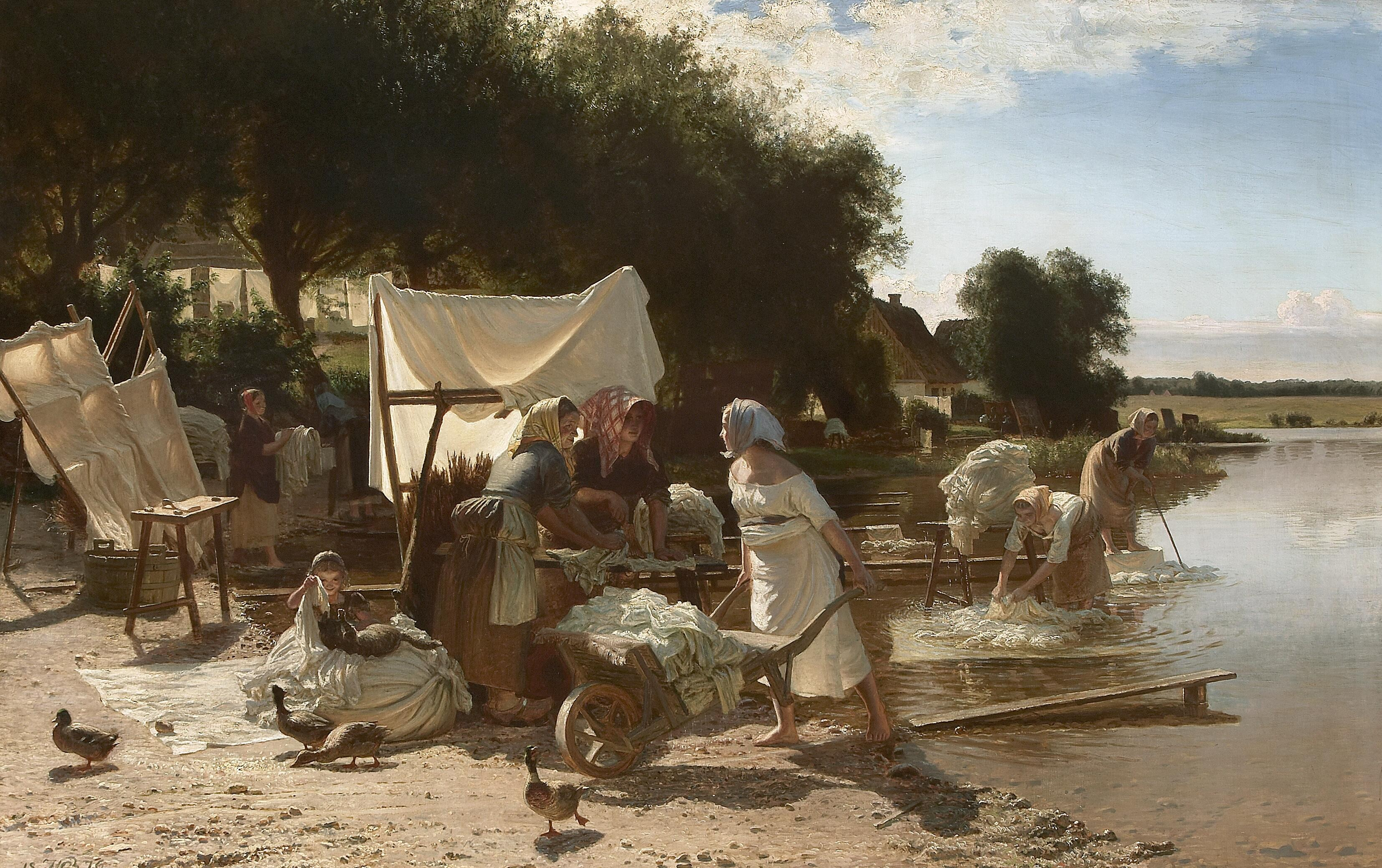
Sørup (1876)

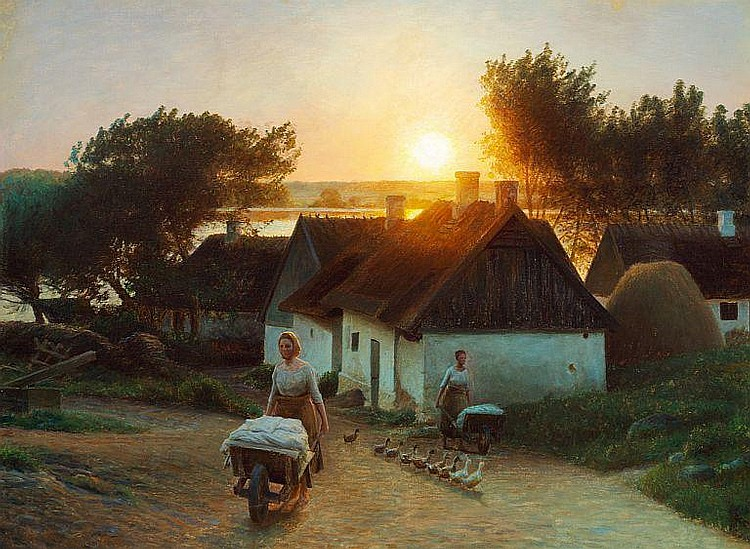
Sørup. Summer Evening

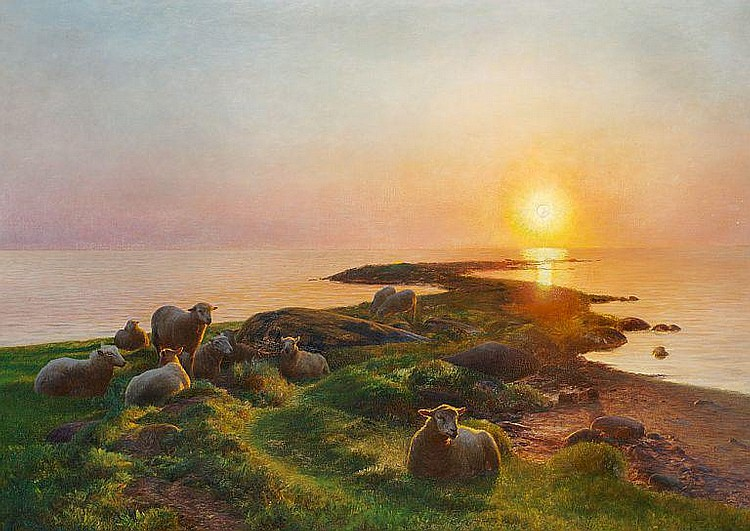
Summer Evening

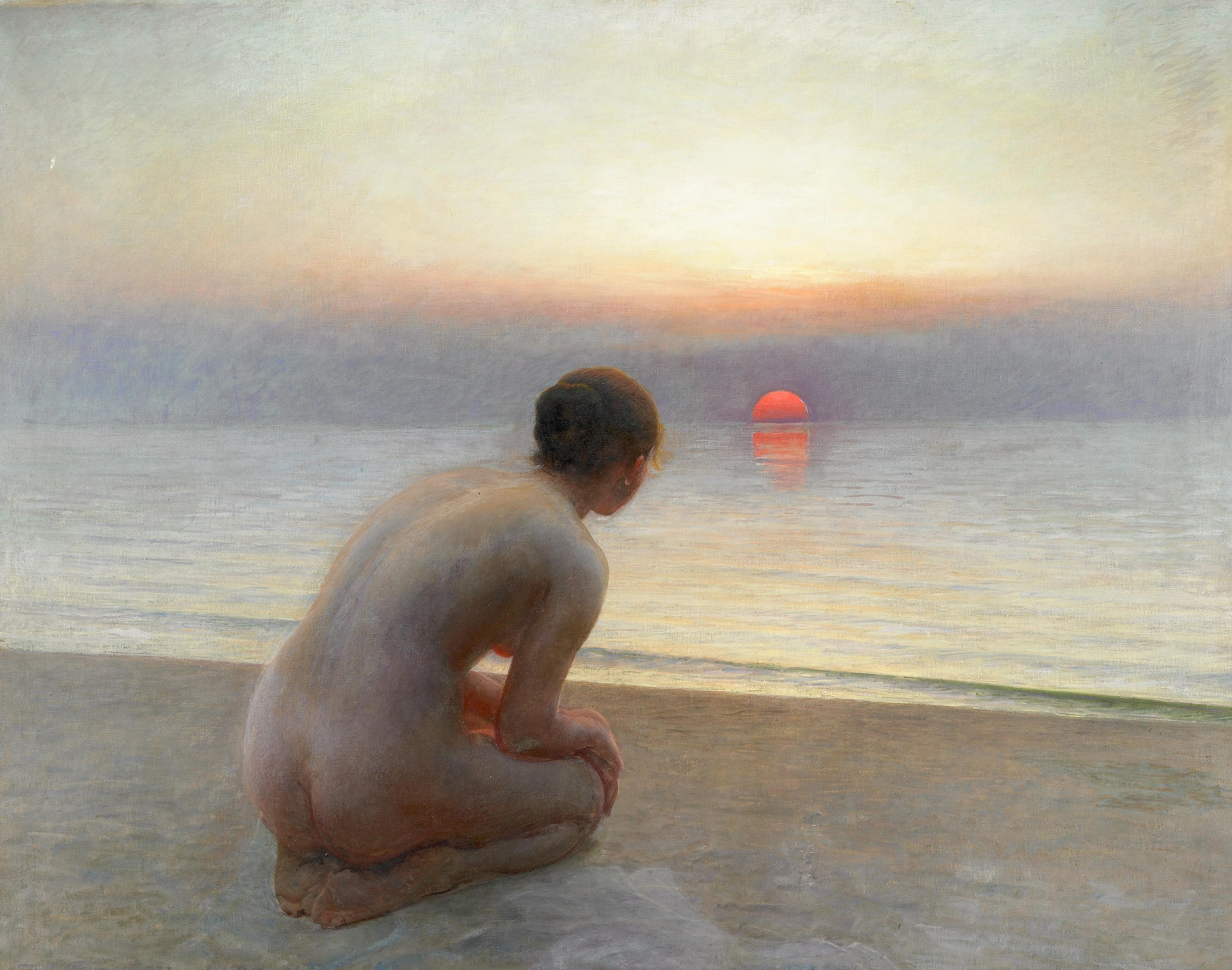
Morning Greetings

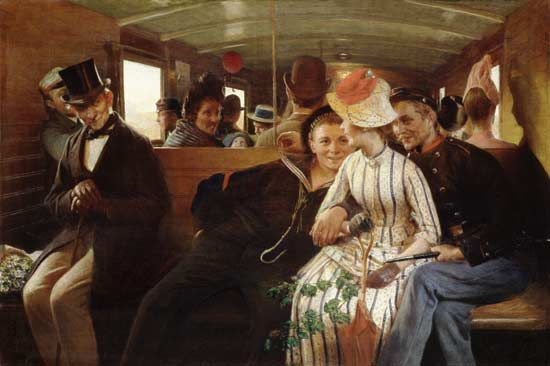
The Second Class Compartment

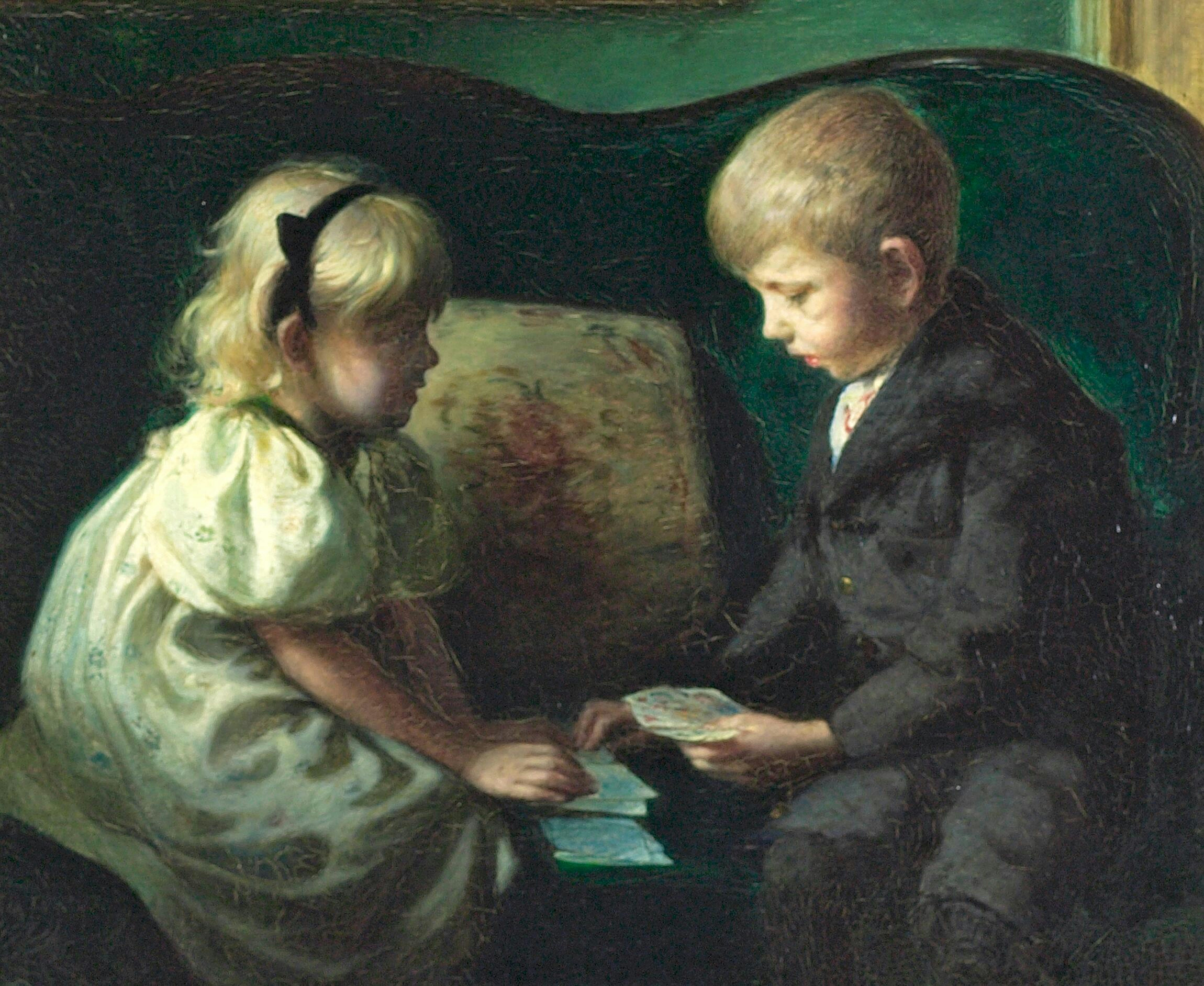
The silversmith and toy designer Kay Bojesen as a child playing cards with his sister Thyra
