= Johanne Sophie Knudsen =

Johanne Sophie Knudsen (née Bergmann, 1742–1796) was a Danish stage actress. She belonged to the elite members of the Royal Danish Theatre in 1765-95.

Born in Hillerød, she was the daughter of Henrik Hansen Bergmann and Petronille Hoffgaard. She married the theater's prompter Lars Knudsen in 1769. She was praised for her natural speech but criticized for her less perfect mimic, and mainly performed the part of ingenue in solemn tragedies. She was referred to by Peder Rosenstand-Goiske as "the best actress owned by our stage".
