= Mork =

Mork or Mörk may refer to:

- Character on the American sitcoms Happy Days and Mork & Mindy (1978–82)
- Mork (file format), a computer file format previously used by Mozilla-based web browsers
- A village near St Briavels in Gloucestershire, England
- Mork, Hama, a village in Syria
- Slang term for aliens in the British science fiction television series The Aliens (TV series) (2016)
- Nickname for K-pop singer Mark Lee
- Nickname for K-pop singer Mark Tuan

== People ==
- Adrien Mörk (born 1979), French professional golfer
- Hans Mork, Australian rugby league footballer
- Ingolf Mork (1947–2012), Norwegian ski jumper
- Louise Mörk (born 1993), Swedish politician

== See also ==
- Mørk, Norwegian or Danish surname
