= Hillerød =

City in Capital Region, Denmark

- City
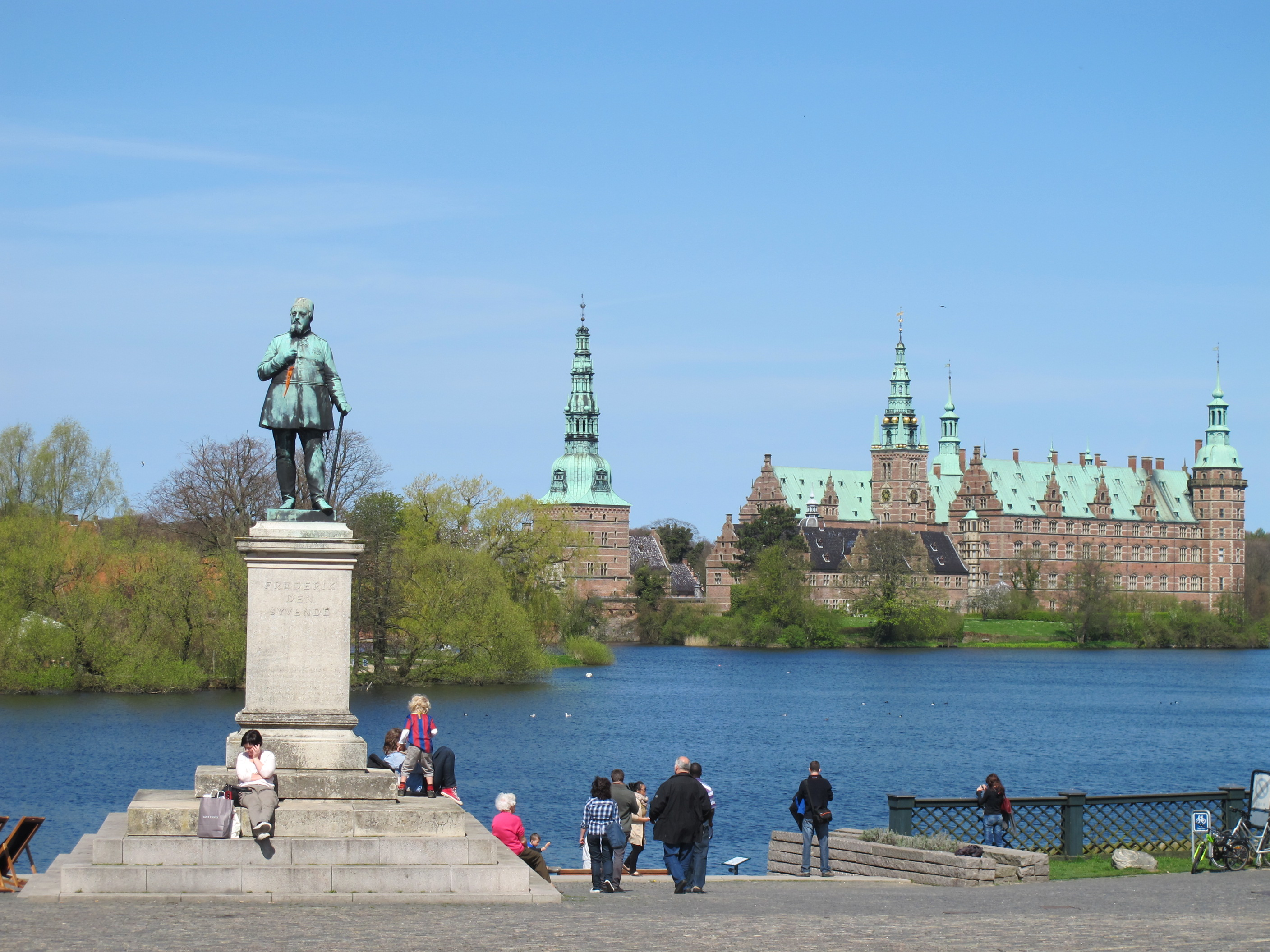
- Frederiksborg Castle

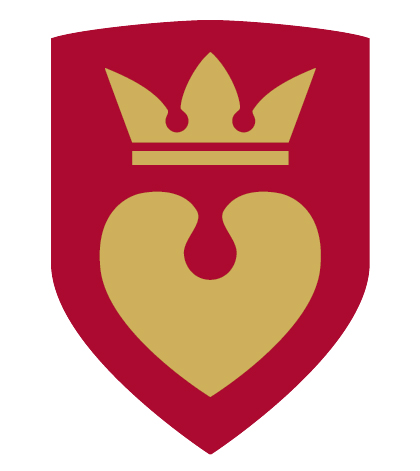
- Coat of arms

- Location in Denmark Hillerød (Capital Region)
- Coordinates: 55°55′45″N 12°18′29″E
- Country: Denmark
- Region: Capital (Hovedstaden)
- Municipality: Hillerød

Government
  - Mayor: Kirsten Jensen

Area
  - Urban: 17.8 km^{2} (6.9 sq mi)
- Elevation: 41 m (135 ft)

Population (2026)
  - Urban: 36,873
  - Urban density: 2,070/km^{2} (5,370/sq mi)
  - Gender: 17,788 males and 19,085 females
  - Municipality: 55,182
- Demonym: Hillerødaner
- Time zone: UTC+1 (CET)
  - Summer (DST): UTC+2 (CEST)
- Postal code: 3400
- Area code: (+45) 48
- Website: hillerod.dk

Hillerød (Danish pronunciation: [ˈhiləˌʁœðˀ]) is a Danish town with a population of 36,873 (1 January 2026) located in the centre of North Zealand approximately 30 km to the northwest of Copenhagen, Denmark. Hillerød is the administrative centre of Hillerød Municipality and also the administrative seat of Region Hovedstaden (Capital Region of Denmark), one of the five regions in Denmark. It is most known for its large Renaissance castle, Frederiksborg Castle, now home to the Museum of National History. The town is surrounded by the former royal forests of Gribskov to the north and Store Dyrehave to the south.

== History ==
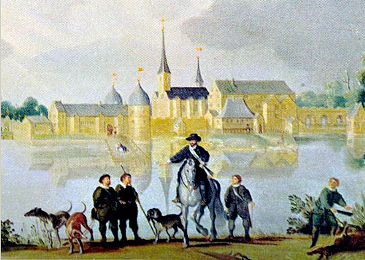
Hillerødsholm, c. 1584

Map of the town from 1677.

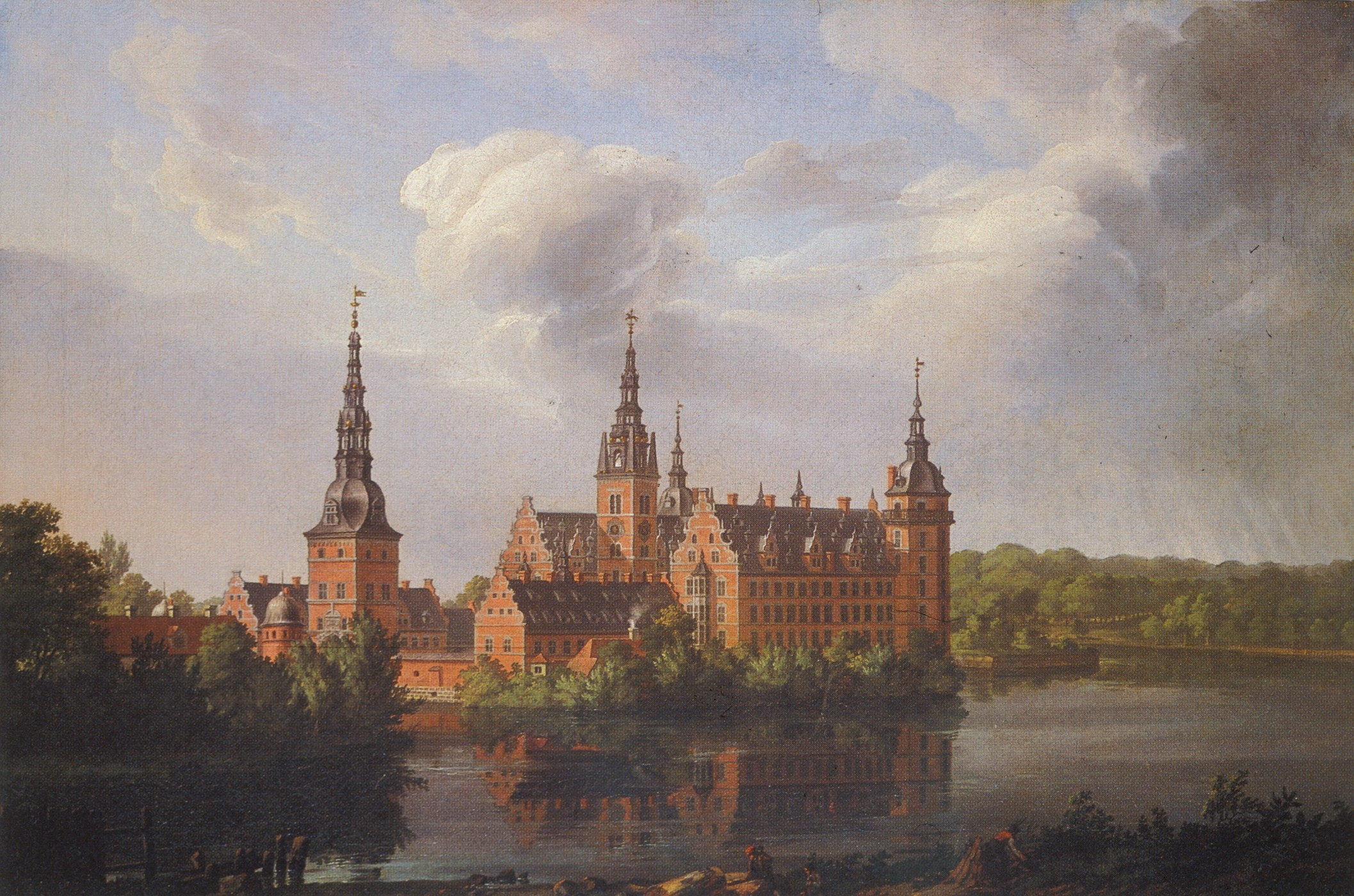
Frederiksborg Castle, 1814

Hillerød was founded during the early medieval times. The name is first mentioned in 1552 as Hylderødz, deriving from the male name Hildi and the suffix -rød, meaning "Hildi's clearing".

In 1550, crown prince Frederick acquired Hillerødsholm in exchange for other properties. His son, Christian IV, tore down most of the old buildings and built a new castle between 1602 and 1625. It was never officially incorporated as a market town but prospered from ample privileges afforded by successive monarchs, although it experienced a setback when Frederick IV moved court to Fredensborg Palace in the 1720s. Hillerød was from 1772 until 1908 named Frederiksborg after its castle. Its first town council was established in 1778 and its town shield, which features a flowering elder tree, is from 1787.

The arrival of the railway brought new prosperity to the town, when the Zealand Railway Company opened the final stage of the North Line between Copenhagen and Helsingør on 8 June 1864. It was later followed by the Gribskov Line to Græsted (80, extended to Gilleleje in 1896, Helsinge in 1897 and Tisvildeleje in 1924) and the Frederiksværk-Hundested Line (1897-1916), which further contributed to Hillerød's status as a local commercial centre. The improvements in infrastructure also attracted new industries. These included Nordstens Fabrikker, a manufacturer of agricultural machinery, which opened in 1877. A privately owned slaughterhouse and meatpacking facility, Hillerød Svineslagteri, opened in 1896. It was converted into the cooperative Hillerød Andelssvineslagteri by 300 local farmers in 1913.

== Economy ==
Foss A/S, a major provider of high-tech analytical solutions for the global food industry, is based in Hillerød. Novo and FujiFilm Diosynth Biotechnology are other major employers with expanding sites in Hillerød's industrial park. The pension fund ATP is also headquartered in Hillerød.

=== Shopping ===
The two principal shopping streets are Slotsgade and pedestrianized Helsingørsgade. The largest shopping centre is Slotsarkaderne with 50 stores.

=== The hospital project ===
Hillerød has been chosen as the site for a new regional hospital: 'Nyt Hospital Nordsjælland' (English: New North Zealand Hospital). To support the hospital, a new urban zone called Favrholm will be created in the south end of the city, and a new S-train station will provide access to the hospital. The project began in 2012 and the hospital should be ready in 2020. When completed, 'Nyt Hospital Nordsjælland' will be the largest hospital in the country.

== Education ==
The characteristics of business life in Hillerød are primarily pharmaceutical industry, knowledge, production and education. The municipality and the state administers a number of educational institutions offering short-term or medium-term education. Among them are the Business Academy North Zealand, Hillerød Technical School, Hillerød Business School, Hillerød Tekniske Gymnasium, Frederiksborg Gymnasium og HF, VUC and Hillerød teacher training college.

The settlement of Nødebo on the southeastern banks of Esrum Sø and enclosed by Gribskov, is home to the forestry boarding school of 'Skovskolen' (English: 'The Forest School) administered by the University of Copenhagen.

Hillerød also houses a Pharmaceutical College. Pharmakon - Danish College of Pharmacy Practice (Danish: Farmakonomskolen Pharmakon) is a higher tertiary educational institution of pharmaceutical sciences with 602 pharmaconomist students.

== Infrastructure and transport ==
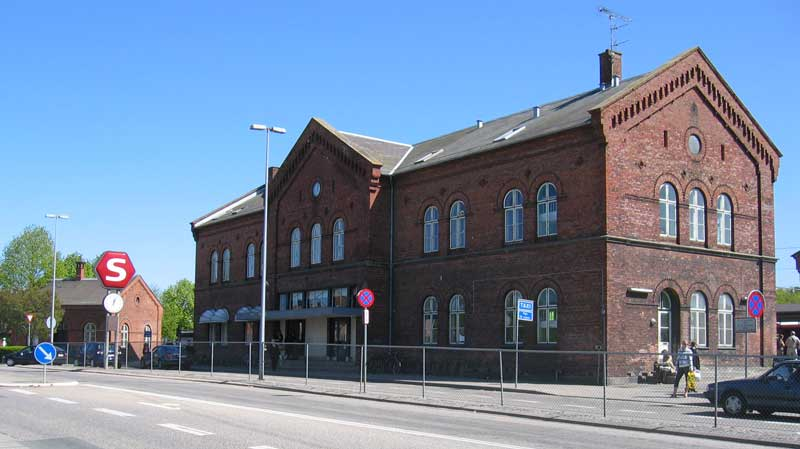
Hillerød railway station

Hillerød is served by Hillerød railway station which is the terminus of the Hillerød radial of Greater Copenhagen's S-train network as well as several local railway lines. The town's northern part is also served by Slotspavillonen railway halt and its southern part by Favrholm railway station.

== Attractions and tourism ==
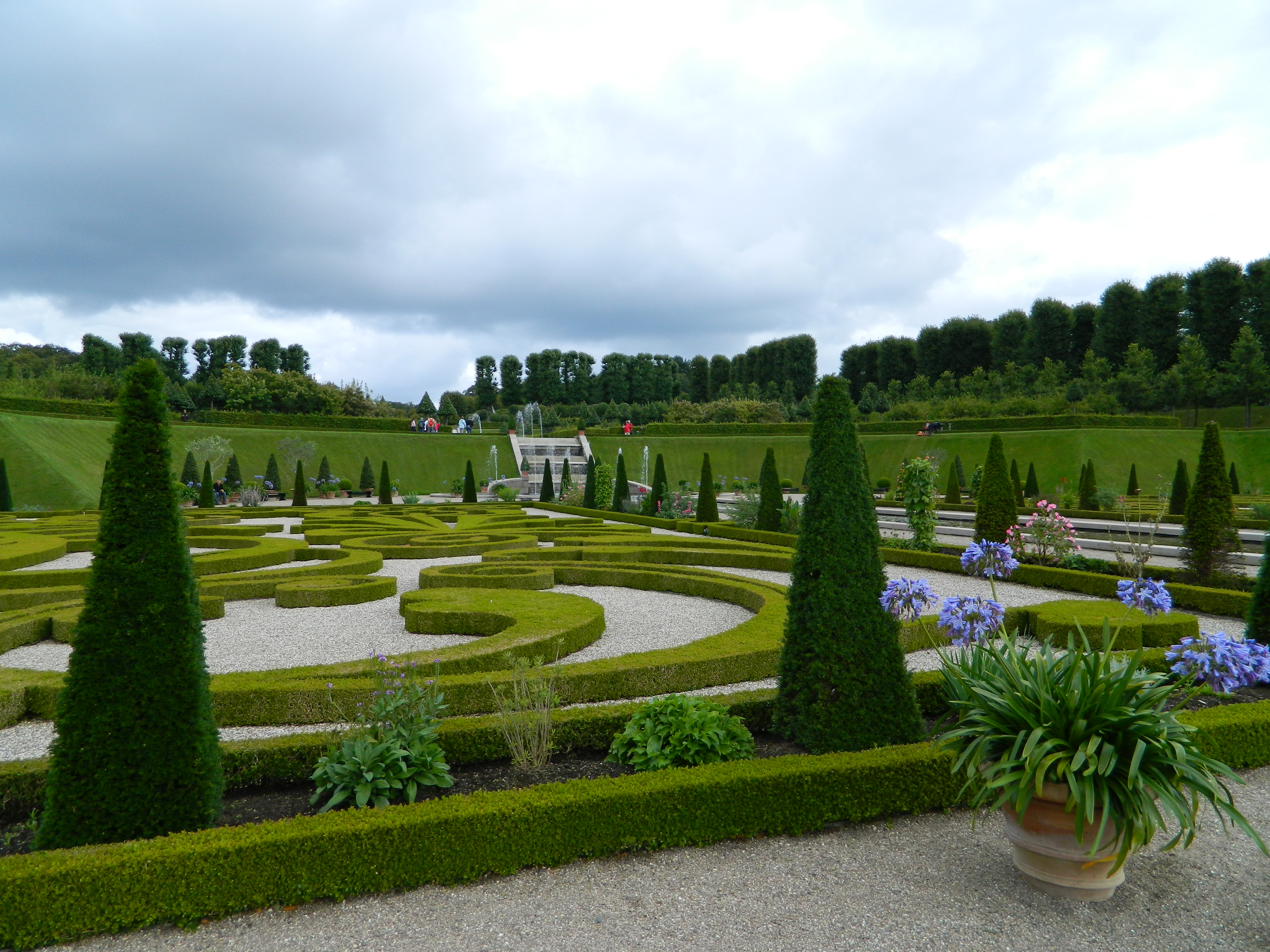
The Park of Frederiksborg Castle

The best known monument is Frederiksborg Castle, which was long a seat of Danish kings. The castle is open to the public and houses the Frederiksborg Museum/ The Museum of National History. The castle also has a large baroque garden.

The Town Museum ("Bymuseet") contains a permanent exhibition on the history of Hillerød.

"The Boiler Room" ("Kedelhuset") has changing special exhibits. In 2005, the subject was the ancient and medieval history of Northern Zealand.

The ruins of Æbelholt Abbey (Æbelholt Klosterruin) are the remains of the largest Augustinian monastery in the northern countries. The site also contains a museum showing its history. The monastery was founded in 1175/76 by the French Augustinian, William of Æbelholt, later Saint William, for the reform of the already extant Eskilsø Abbey, which was moved here. He was summoned to the task by the Danish archbishop and statesman Absalon. After the Reformation in 1536, the monastery lands were appropriated by the state and the buildings were torn down. Some of the bricks were later used in the construction of Frederiksborg Castle.

Esrum Abbey ("Esrum Kloster") is a Cistercian monastery dating from 1151. The only remaining building of this once vast complex now houses a permanent exhibition about the Cistercians. There is a restaurant in the vaults. Next to the monastery is "Esrum Møllegaard", the Nature and Environmental Centre of Ecology.

Another cultural institution is "Hillerød Viden- og Kulturpark" (Hillerød Knowledge and Culture Park); a library with surrounding culture workshops and game spots. This is the gathering spot for the cultural life of Hillerød - with exhibitions, music and theatre.

== Nature and countryside ==
Hillerød is surrounded by some of the most extensive woodlands in Denmark, with Store Dyrehave to the south and the forests of Gribskov to the north. Gribskov is the fourth largest connected woodland in the country and both of the forests are rich with wild game, primarily deer.

Just east of Gribskov is Esrum Sø, the second largest lake in Denmark and a few kilometers northeast of Hillerøds city center is Fredensborg Palace and its extensive baroque gardens, on the east coast of Lake Esrum.

Scattered around the vicinity of Hillerød, is a number of smaller settlements and villages like Tulstrup, Ullerød, Gadevang, Nødebo, Sørup and Ny Hammersholt. Ullerød is both an old parish and a new borough at 150 ha and is connected directly to Hillerød.

== Notable people ==
=== Public Service & Public thinking ===
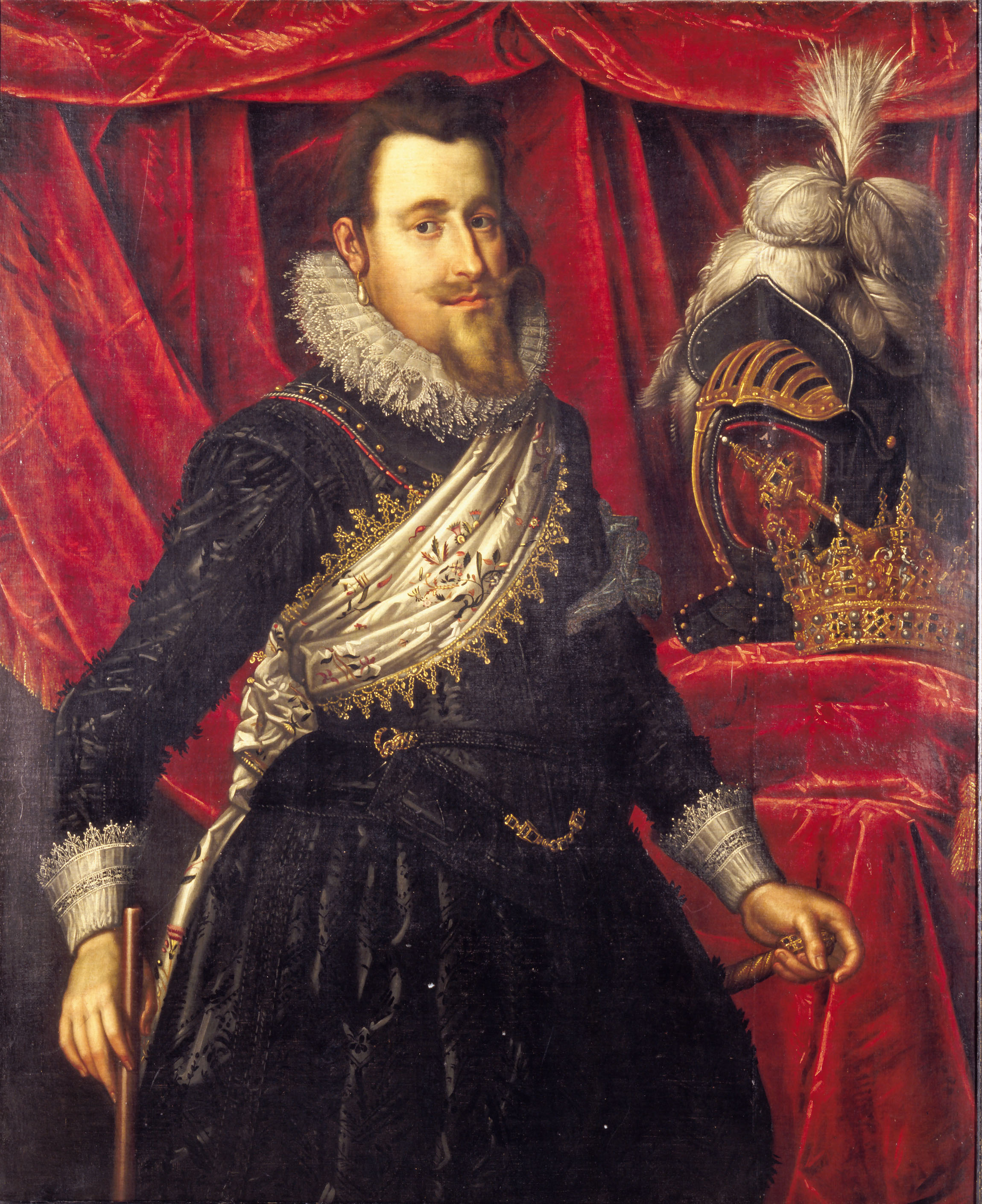
Christian IV 1612

- Christian IV of Denmark (1577–1648), king of Denmark-Norway and Duke of Holstein and Schleswig from 1588 to 1648. His 59-year reign is the longest of Danish monarchs
- Prince Ulrik of Denmark (1611–1633), son of King Christian IV of Denmark
- Carl Edvard Rotwitt (1812–1860), a Danish politician; Prime Minister of Denmark 1859–1860
- Henning Frederik Feilberg (1831–1921), a Danish pastor, author and folklorist
- Marie Mørk (1861–1940), school founder
- Jutta Graae (1906–1997), a Danish bank employee, became a member of the Danish resistance in WWII, subsequently worked for Danish Defence Intelligence Service
- Kai Larsen (1926–2012), a Danish botanist and academic
- Dorte Olesen (born 1948), a mathematician, first Danish female full professor of mathematics
- Simon Emil Ammitzbøll (born 1977), politician, member of the Parliament of Denmark, former Minister of Economy and Interior
- Aki-Matilda Høegh-Dam (born 1996), a Greenlandic politician and Miss Denmark competitor in 2015

=== The Arts ===
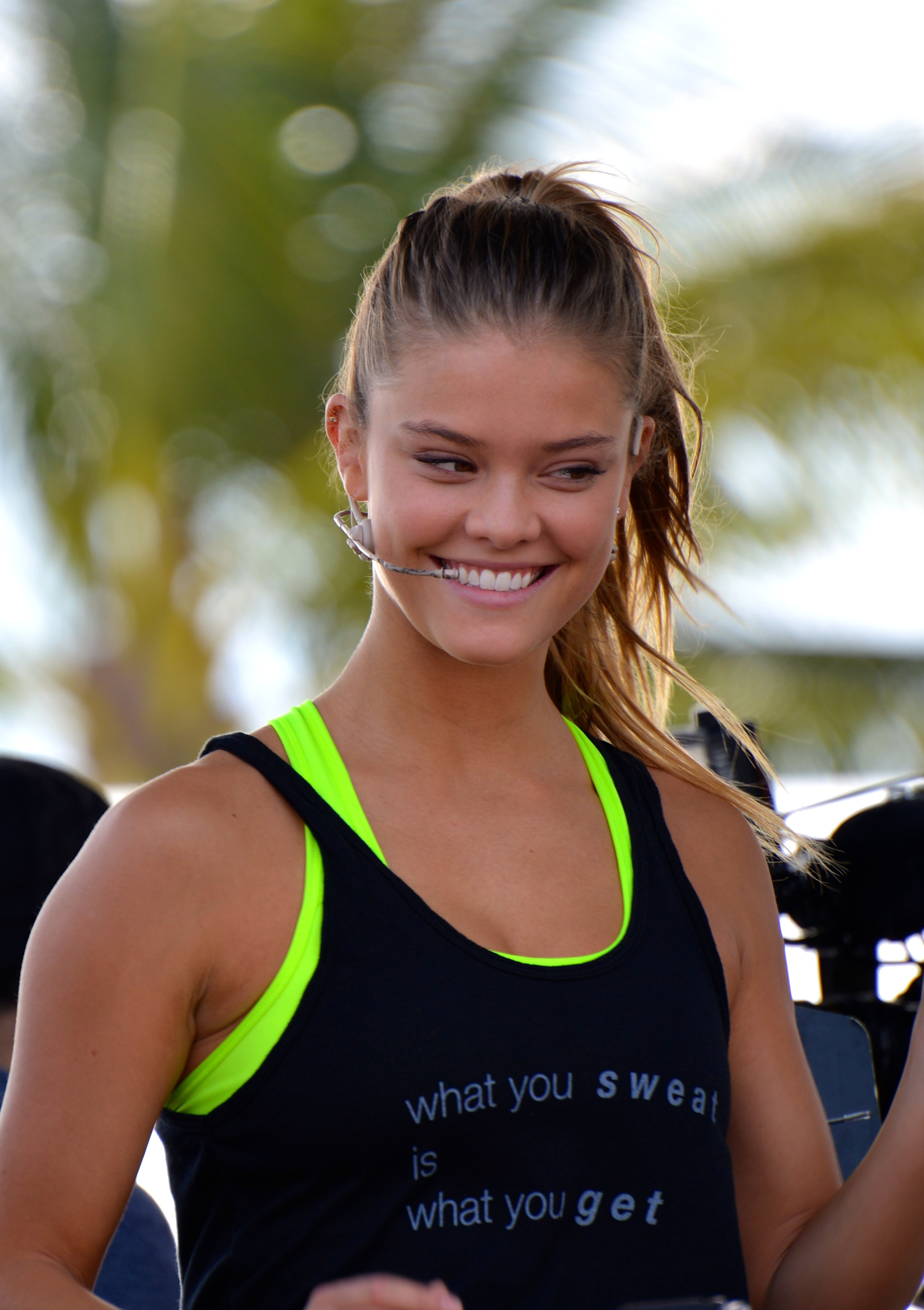
Nina Agdal

- Johanne Sophie Knudsen (1742–1796), actress
- Godtfred Rump (1816–1880), Danish painter of genre art, history and landscape painting
- Louis Hasselriis (1844–1912), a Danish sculptor of public statuary
- Hans Ole Brasen (1849–1930), Danish painter. He won the Eckersberg Medal in 1894.
- Mogens Bøggild (1901–1987), Danish sculptor, specialized in figures of animals
- Ole Kielberg (1911–1985), Danish painter, joined the artists' colony in Zealand known as the Odsherred Painters
- Aase Bredsdorff (1919–2017), a librarian, promoted literature for children and young people
- Jesper Lundgaard (born 1954), a jazz bassist, bandleader, composer and record producer
- Lars Halvor Jensen (born 1973), Danish record producer and songwriter.
- Jesper Dahl (born 1973), stage name Jokeren (The Joker), a hip-hop artist and rapper
- Ane Cortzen (born 1974), a Danish TV personality, architect and graphic designer
- Linnéa Handberg Lund (born 1976), stage name Papaya, a Danish Eurodance musician
- Birgitte Hjort Sørensen (born 1982), a Danish actress
- Nina Agdal (born 1992), Danish model, grew up in Hillerød

=== Sport ===
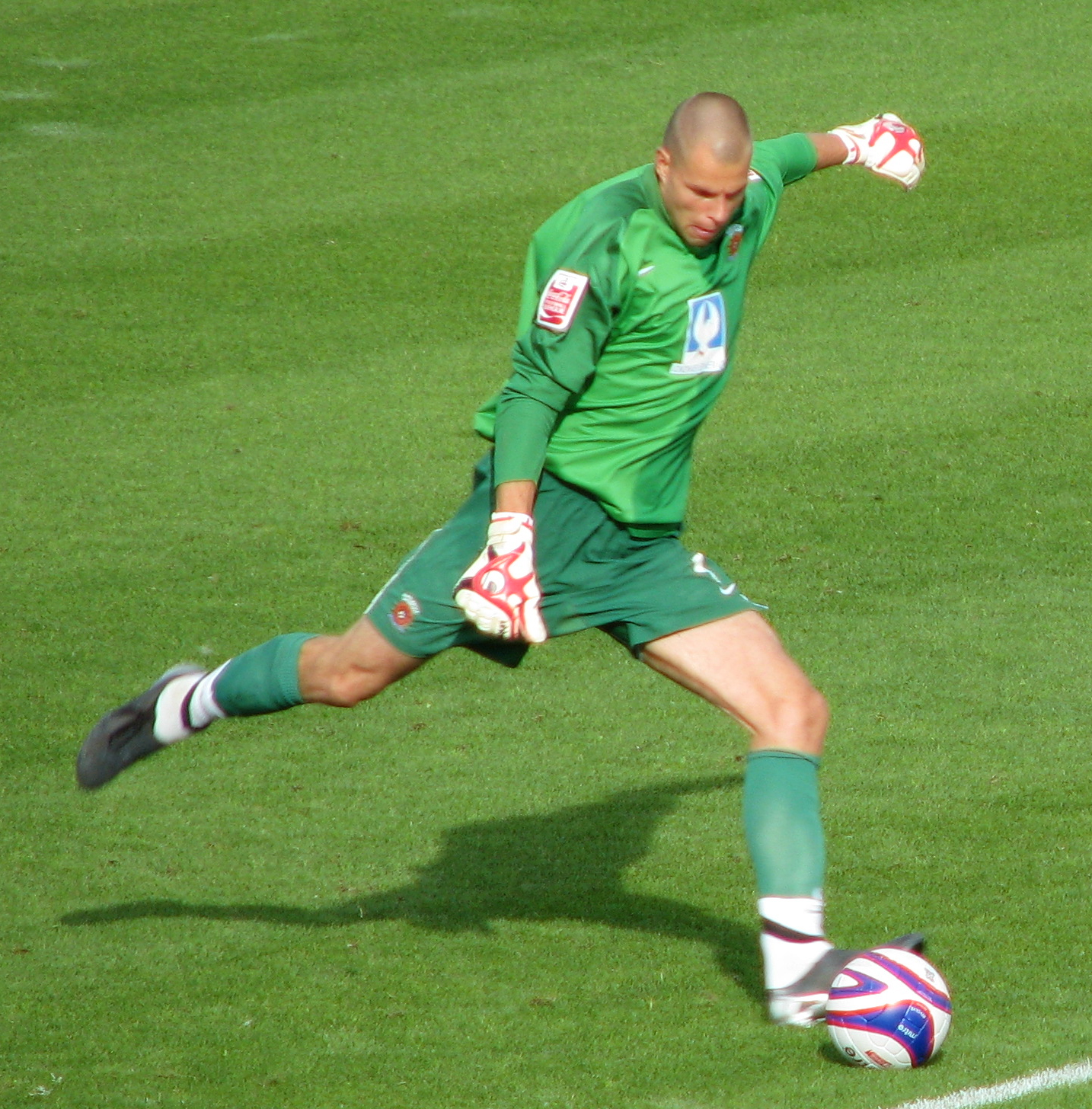
Jan Budtz, 2007

- Peter Jørgensen (1907–1992), boxer who competed at the 1932 Summer Olympics
- Pernille Svarre (born 1961), a Danish former athlete in the triathlon and modern pentathlon
- Helene Kirkegaard (born 1971 in Præstevang), a retired Danish badminton player, competed at the 1996 and 2000 Summer Olympics
- Nicki Sørensen (born 1975), former professional road bicycle racer, current directeur sportif of the Cycling Academy Team
- Jan Budtz (born 1979), a Danish football goalkeeper, over 250 club caps
- Jesper Mikkelsen (born 1980), a former Danish footballer with 373 club caps
- Lasse Jensen (born 1984), golfer who currently plays on the European Tour
- Henriette Engel Hansen (born 1982), world champion sprint canoer and marathon canoeist
- Louise Lyksborg (born 1988), handball player for Viborg HK and Denmark
- Joachim B. Hansen (born 1990), professional golfer plays on the PGA European Tour
- Nicole Broch Larsen (born 1993), professional golfer, plays on the Ladies European Tour
- Kathrine Møller Kühl (born 2003), footballer for Arsenal and the Denmark national team

== Sport and leisure ==
The Hillerød Stadium is the sports complex where the association football team Hillerød Fodbold play. It was formerly the site of a motorcycle speedway stadium known as Selskov Stadium, which at one time was the primary speedway location in Denmark.

The handball team Nordsjælland Håndbold is partly based in Hillerød together with Helsinge and Helsingør.

== Gallery ==
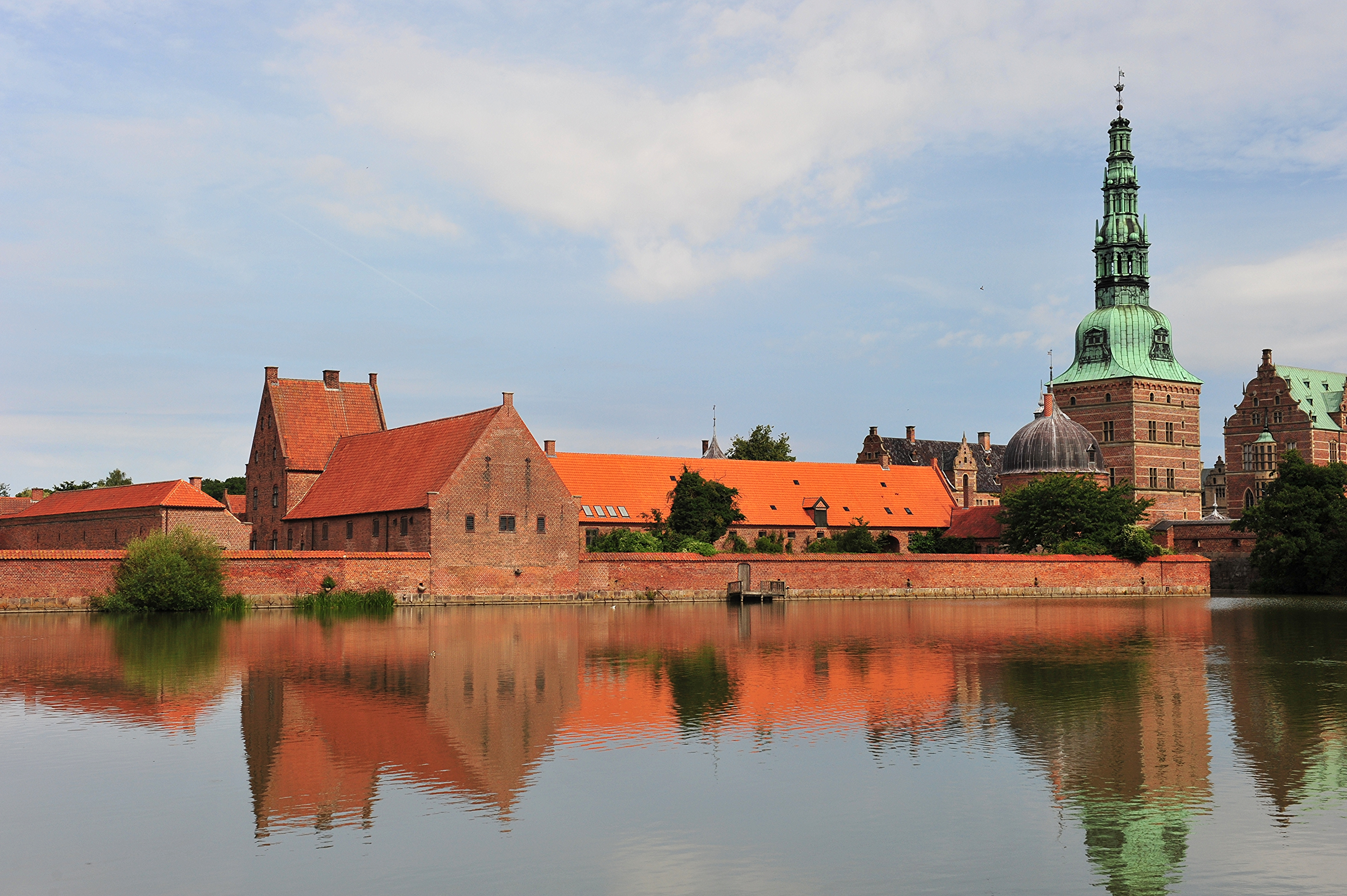
The Castle Lake

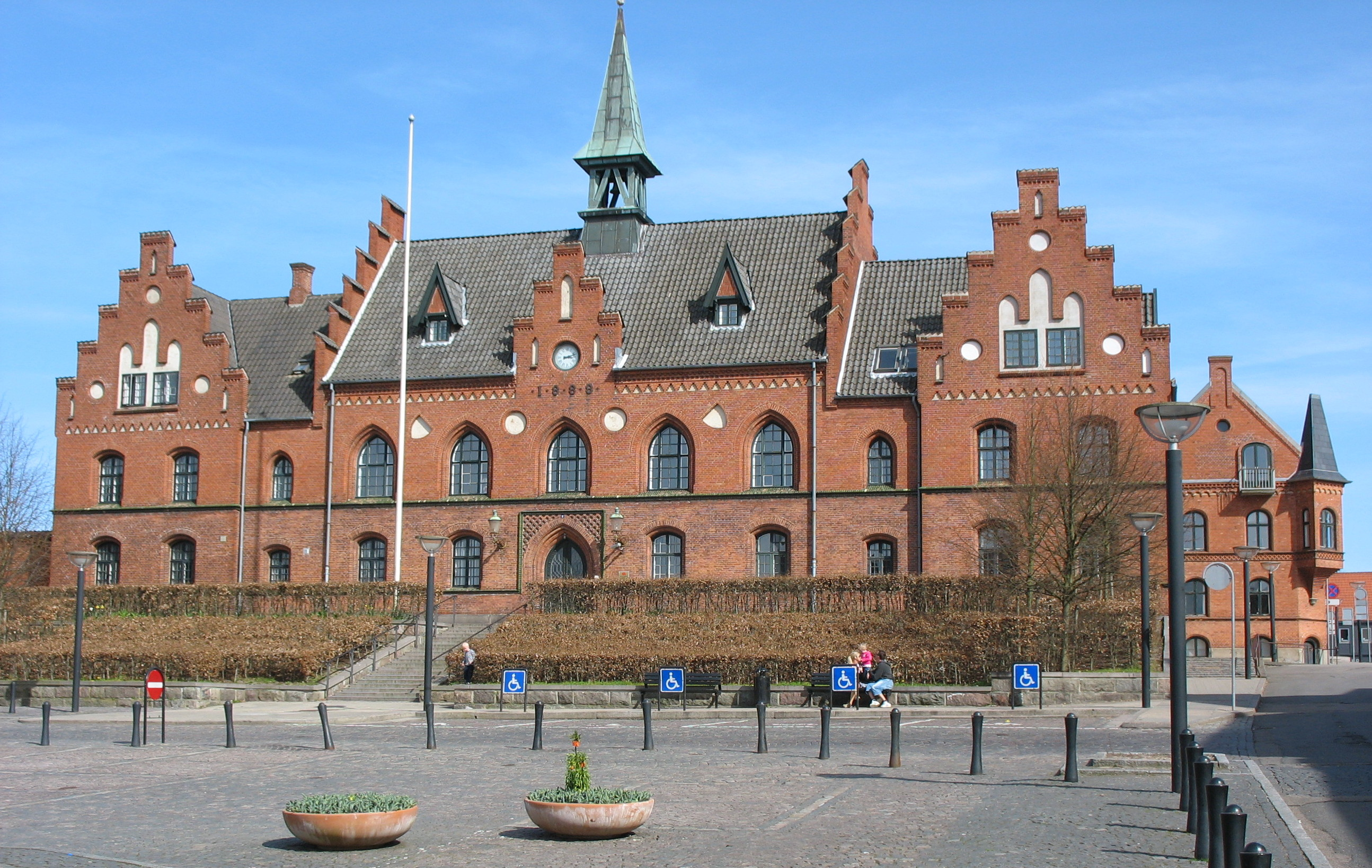
Old Town Hall

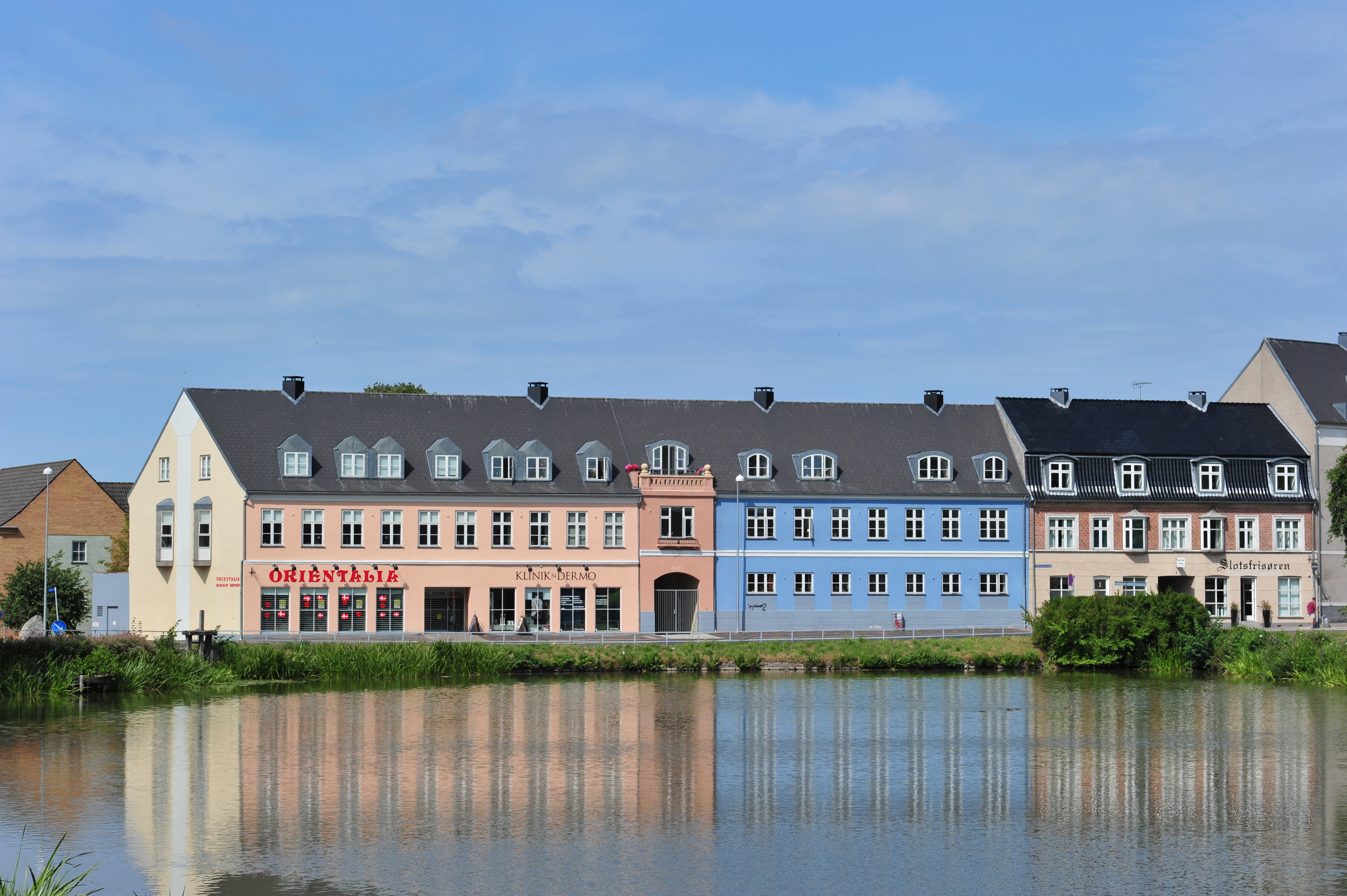
Houses

== See also ==
- Hillerød Kommune
- Hillerød station
