= Tokkekøb Hegn =

Danish forest

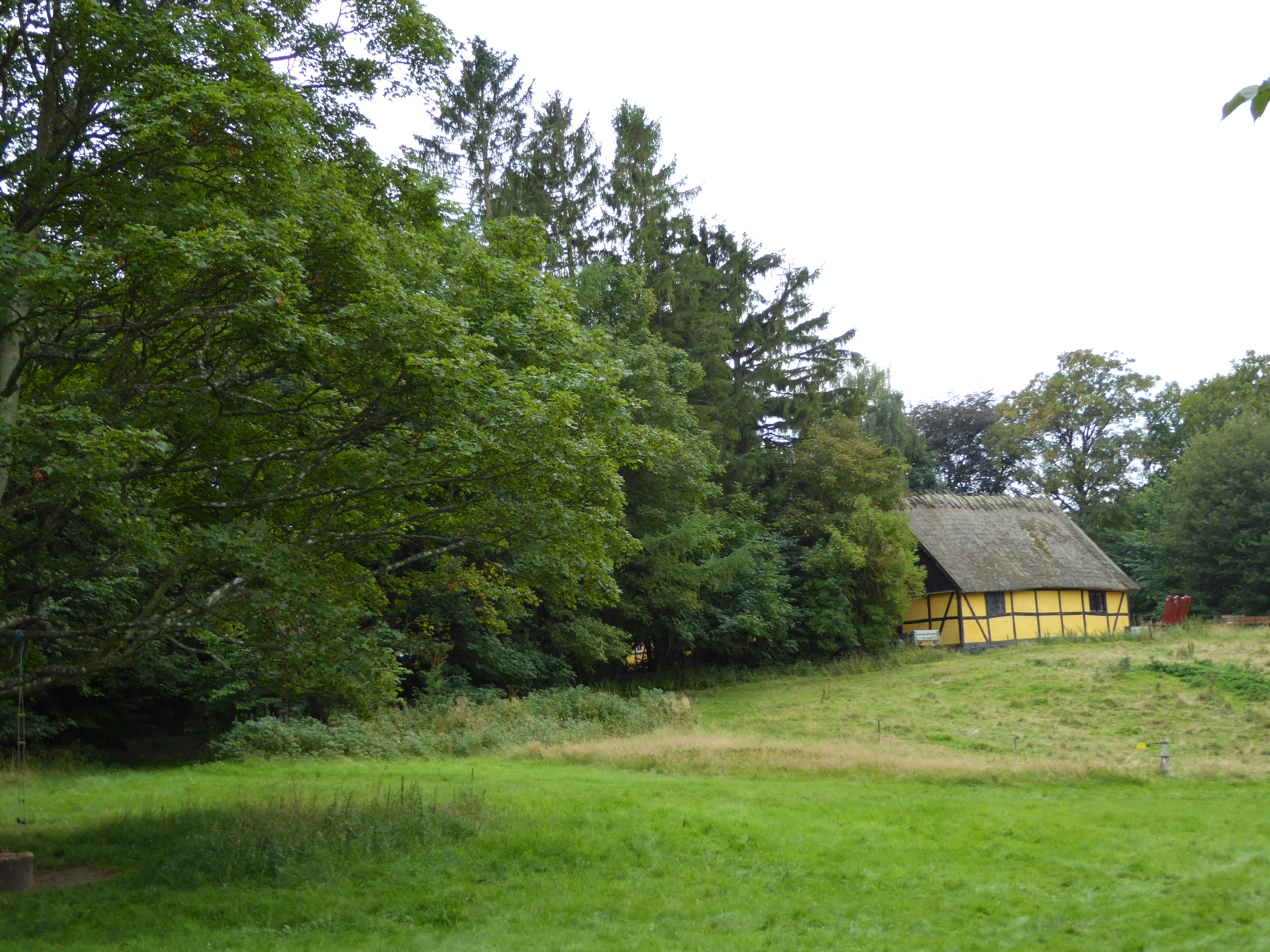
- Dampegård in Tokkekøb Hegn
- Interactive map of Tokkekøb Hegn

Geography
- Location: Allerød, Denmark
- Coordinates: 55°53′N 12°23′E
- Area: 3.61 km^{2} (1.39 sq mi)

Tokkekøb Hegn is a forest located north of Blovstrød and east of Lillerød in Allerød Municipality, North Zealand, some 20 km north of central Copenhagen, Denmark. It adjoins Store Dyrehave to the north, although an open landscape surrounding the village of Kirkelte partly separates the two forests. To the south it adjoins the Høvelte-Sandholm military trainings grounds.

== History ==
The forest was from 1391 owned by the crown as part of Hørsholm Manor. Donse Krudtværk, a water-powered gunpowder mill, was built in 1704. A brickyard opened in 1879. In 1771, ownership of the forest was ceded to the state.

Most of the forest disappeared in the beginning of the 1800s. In 1992, a large explosion killed several people. It closed in 1910.

== Historic features ==
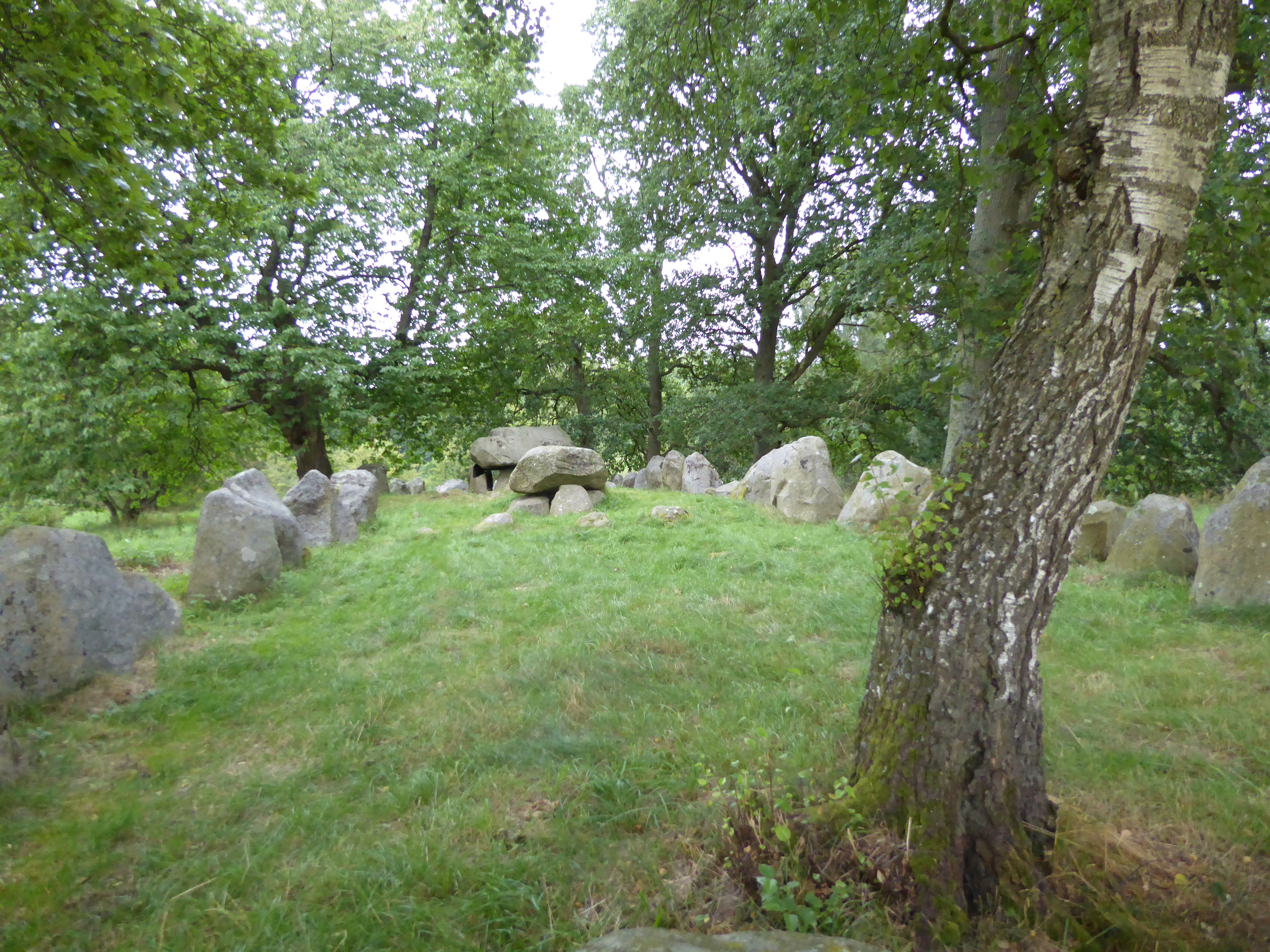
Dæmpegårdsdyssen

Dæmpegård is a half-timbered, thatched houselocated next to an open area, Dæmpegårdssletten, which takes its name after it.

Tokkekøb is known for its many dolmens from the Bronze Age. Dæmpegårdsdyssen is located on Dampegårdssletten and dates from 4000 BC. It is 38 metres long and 9 metres wide and has two burial chambers. King Frederick VII participated in its excavation and it is therefore also known as Kongedyssen. His monogram his carved in one of the stones. Other dolmens are located at Hjortemose, Avlskarlevold and Linjevej.

== Activities ==
A 9 kilometre mountain bike route was inaugurated in 2010. It is part of a 23 kilometre single-track route, Kongeruten, whose remaining portion is located in Store Dyrehave. Fishing is permitted in Lergraven.
