= Store Dyrehave =

Forest in Denmark

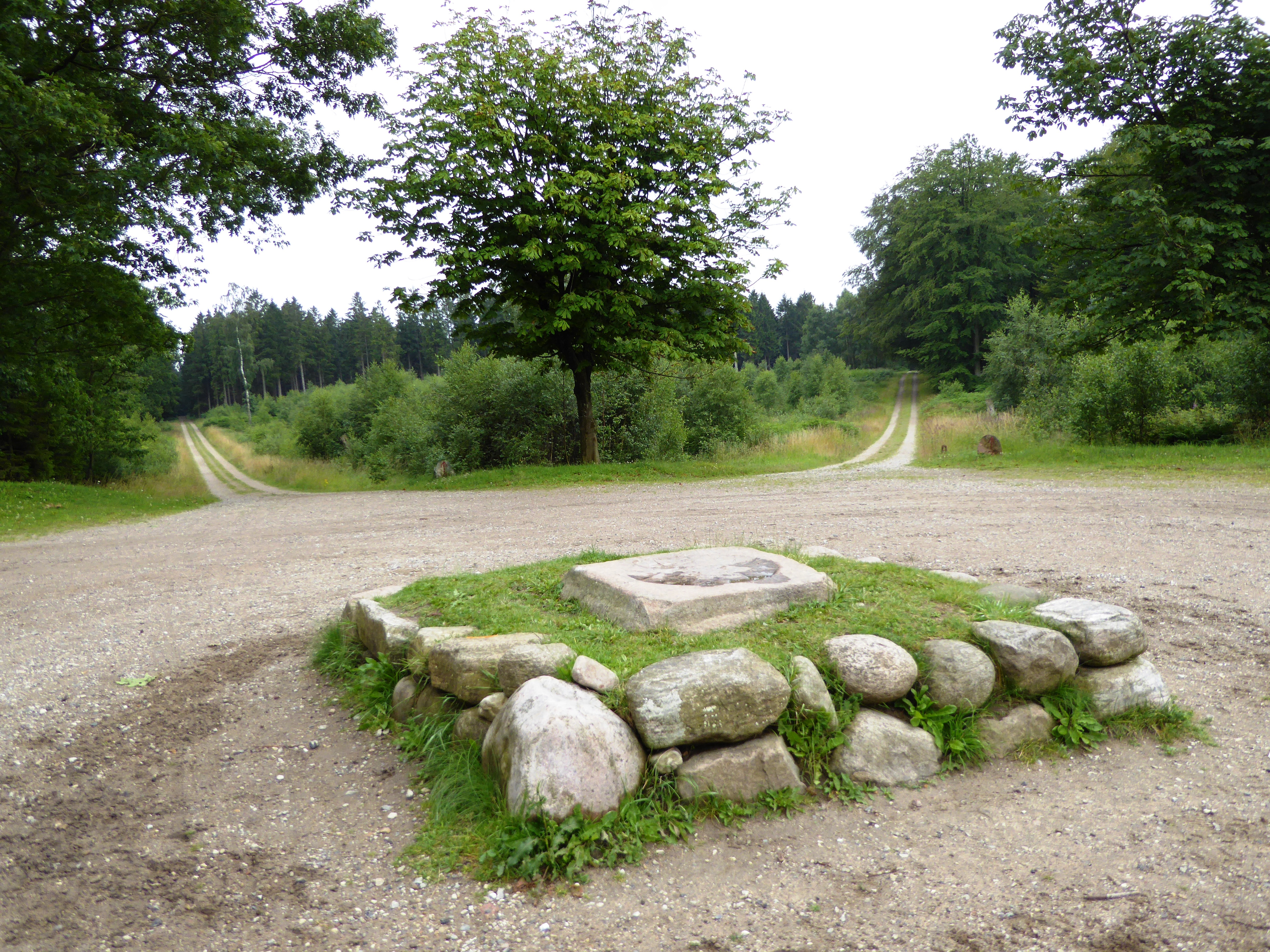
- The 8-way junction of Stjernen (lit.: The Star) with the King's Stone at the centre. Store Dyrehave.

- Location within Denmark
- Interactive map of Store Dyrehave

Geography
- Location: Hillerød, Denmark
- Coordinates: 55°54′46″N 12°21′30″E
- Area: 14.2 km^{2} (5.5 sq mi)

Ecology
- WWF Classification: Baltic mixed forests

Store Dyrehave (lit. 'Large Animal Park') is a forest located to the east of the village Ny Hammersholt immediately south of Hillerød, on both sides of Københavnsvej, in North Zealand, Denmark. Consisting of conifers and beech, it was enclosed with stone walls in 1619–28 as a royal deer park for hunting. In 1680, Christian V introduced a geometrical system of roads forming a star with eight branches for par force hunting. Although par force hunting was discontinued in 1777, the road system and numbered stone posts remain fully intact. Store Dyrehave is one of the three forests forming the Par force hunting landscape in North Zealand, a UNESCO World Heritage Site.

== Location ==
Store Dyrehave has an almost quadratic shape. Præstevang, an area on the northwestern side of the forest, is bounded by the town of Hillerød on three sides. The small town of Ny Hammersholt and Hillerød Golf Club are located on the southwest side while the northeastern margin of the forest is bounded by the Istedrødvej motorway. To the southeast is the small village of Kirkelte in Allerød Municipality. Its open surroundings, which were protected in 1972, partly separate Store Dyrehave from Tokkekøb Hegn. Kongevejen, a former royal road that is now part of secondary route 201, passes through the forest close to its southwestern margin, linking Hillerød with Copenhagen through the towns of Blovstrød, Birkerød and Kongens Lyngby.

== History ==
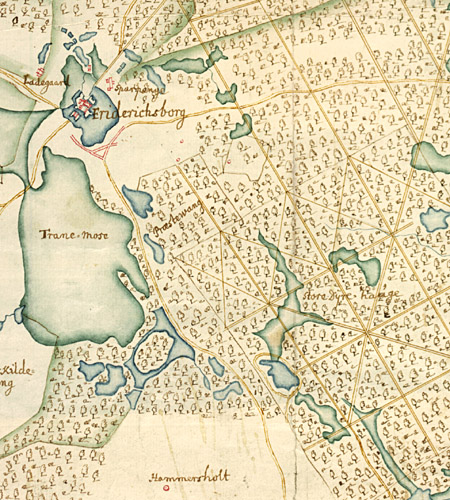
Store Dyrehave seen on a map by H. H. Scheel from about 1700.

The first enclosed deer park for hunting at Christian IV's new Frederiksborg Castle was Lille Dyrehave (Small Deer Park) immediately to the north of the castle (now the Romantic landscape section of the castle's park). Store Dyrehave, south of the castle, was enclosed with stone walls in 1619–28. In 1680, Christian V introduced a French-inspired geometrical system of roads forming a star with eight branches for par force hunting. Par force hunting took place in the forest until 1777.

In the 18th century, the forest was used for breeding Frederiksborg horses by the Royal Frederiksborg Stud. The horses were separated in groups according to colour. Each group consisted of 15-20 mares and one stallion. The blue-couloured horses were kept in Store Dyrehave while the grey ones grazed in Præstevang.

In 1859, Frederick VII created a small Romantic garden complex in Præstevangen in the northwestern part of the forest, which he named Fantasiens Ø (Isle of Fantasy). It is located on a small island created by digging a canal across a peninsula, in the Brededam Lake and originally included a small pavilion and a kitchen annexe. The garden fell into neglect after Frederick VII's death, the kitchen was pulled down in 1905 and the pavilion removed in 1969, but a few ruins remain.

As a part of the Par force hunting landscape in North Zealand, Store Dyrehave was inscribed on the UNESCO list of World Heritage Site on 4 July 2015.

== Ecology ==
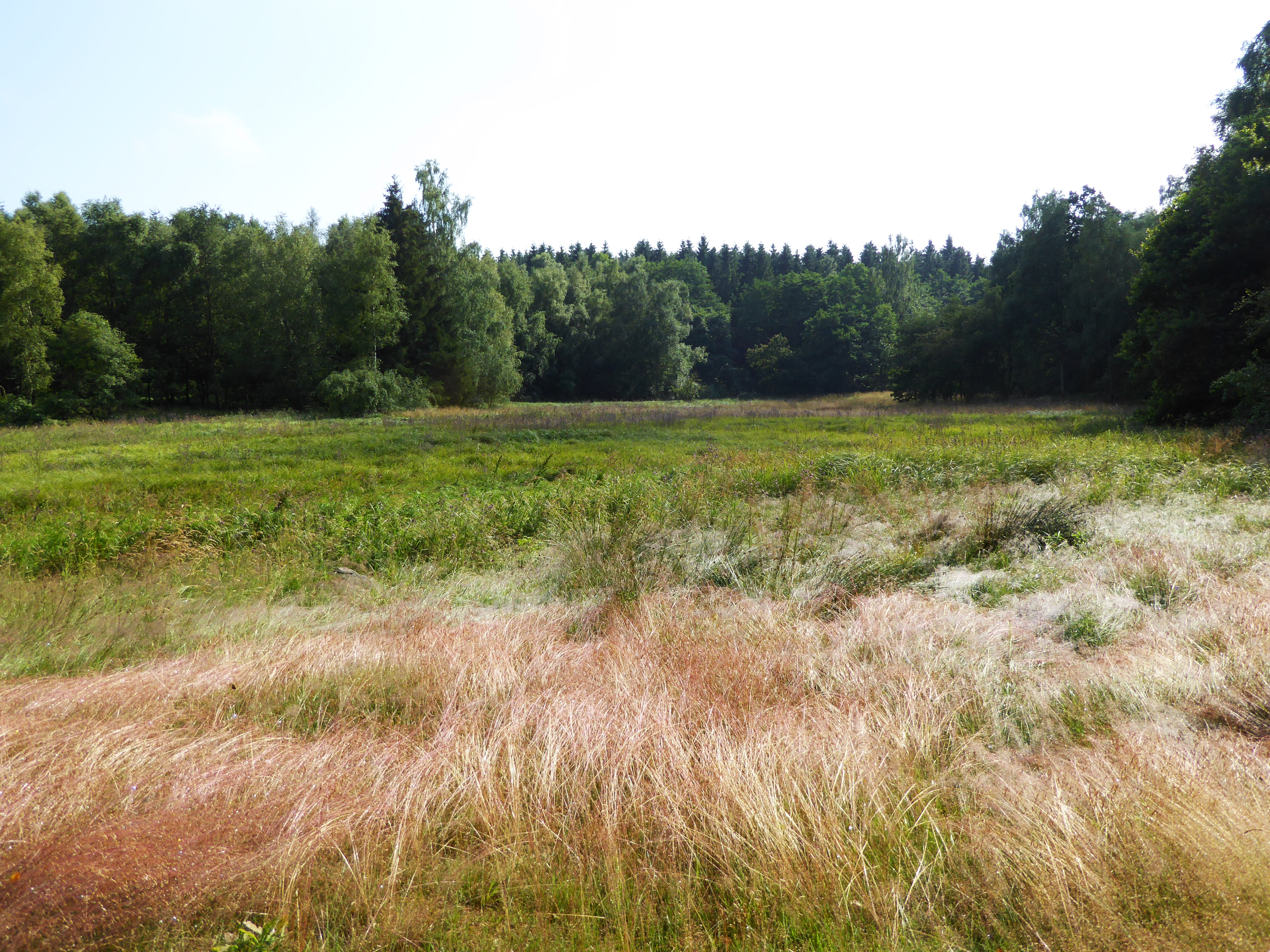
Malte Enghave, a pasture which is again graxed by cattle to keep the area open.

Store Dyrehave comprises 1,230 hectares (3,000 acres) of forest, 18.8 hectares of lakes and ponds, 40.8 hectares of marshland, 21.6 hectares of plains and 9.8 hectares of meadows. Deciduous trees dominate the periphery of the forest, with beech as the most common species, covering 414.8 hectares, while oak trees cover 132 hectares and other deciduous trees cover 120 hectares. Mainly found in the central part of the forest, evergreens cover approximately 364 hectares of which Picea species account for 227 hectares. The share of deciduous forest will gradually be increased.

Maltemosen, in the northern part of the forest, is a poor fen. Typical flora include cotton-grass and wild calla as well as the carnivorous sundew and greater bladderwort. Rågårdsmosen and Sortedam on the southwest side of Kongevejeb close to Ny Hammersholt, are peat bogs.

Store Dyrehave is home to both roe deer and fallow deer, while red deer—which used to be the focus of attention during the royal hunts—are no longer found in the area.

== Historic features ==
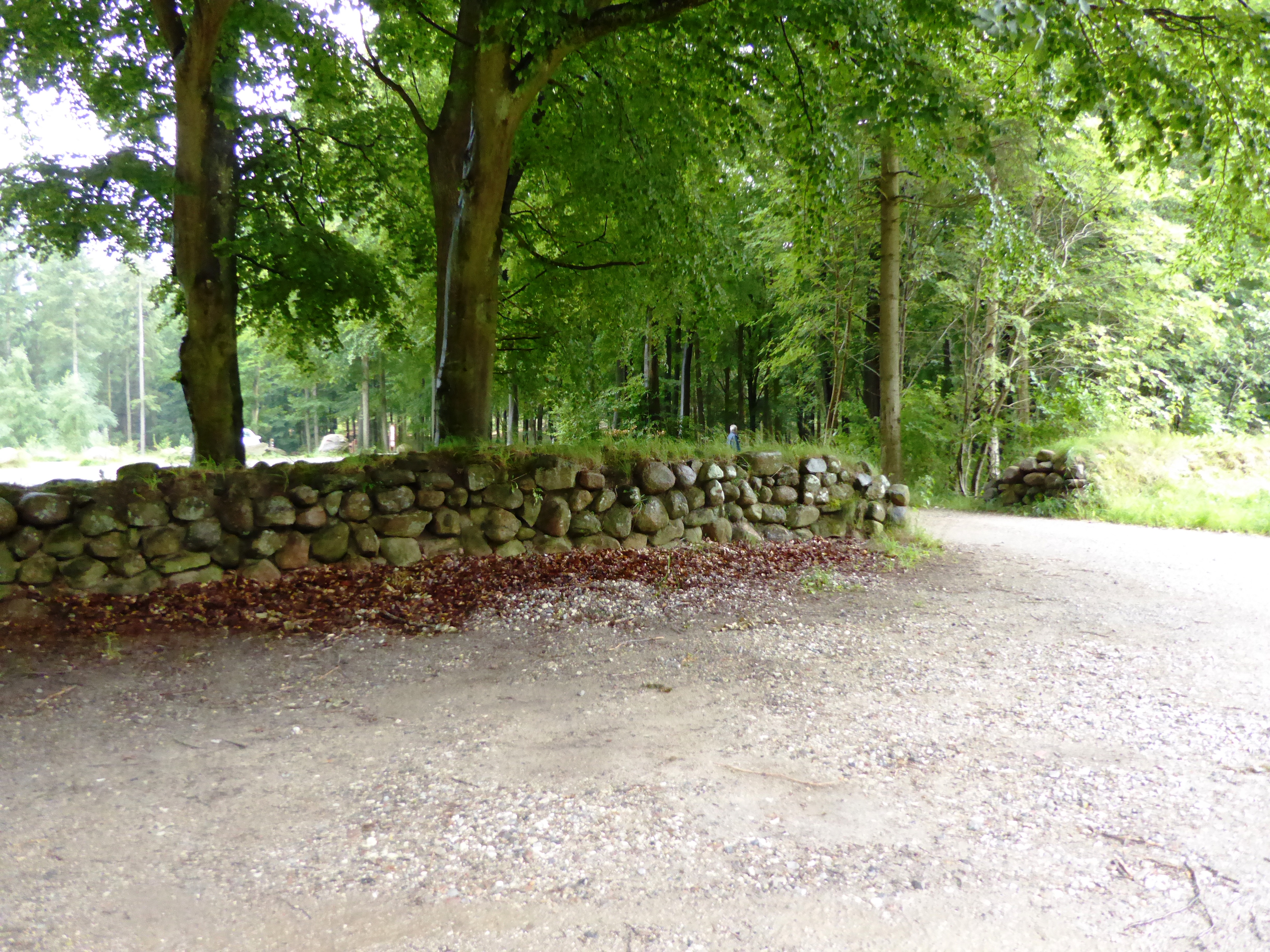
Stone wall on Overdrevsvej

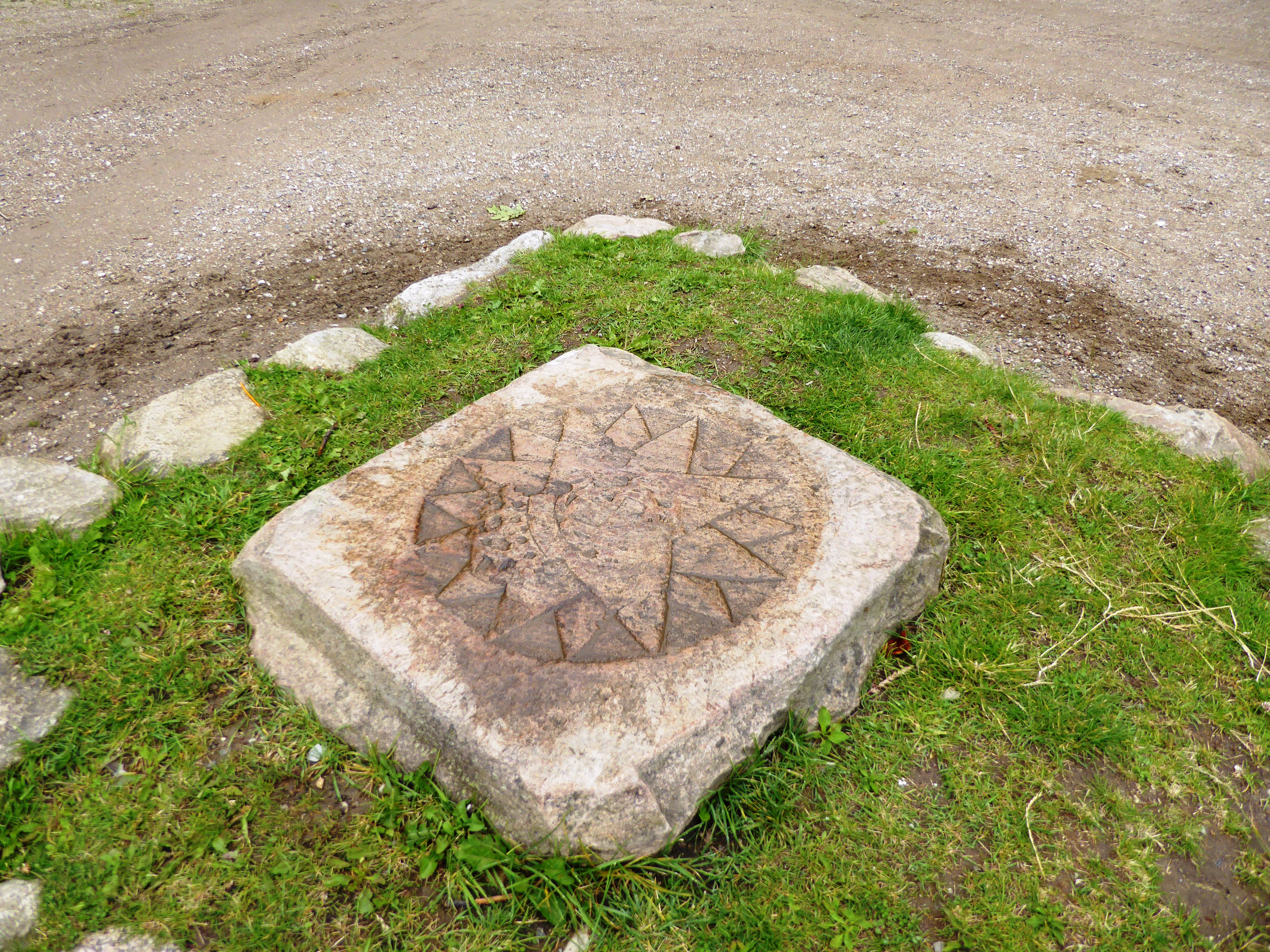
The King's Stone

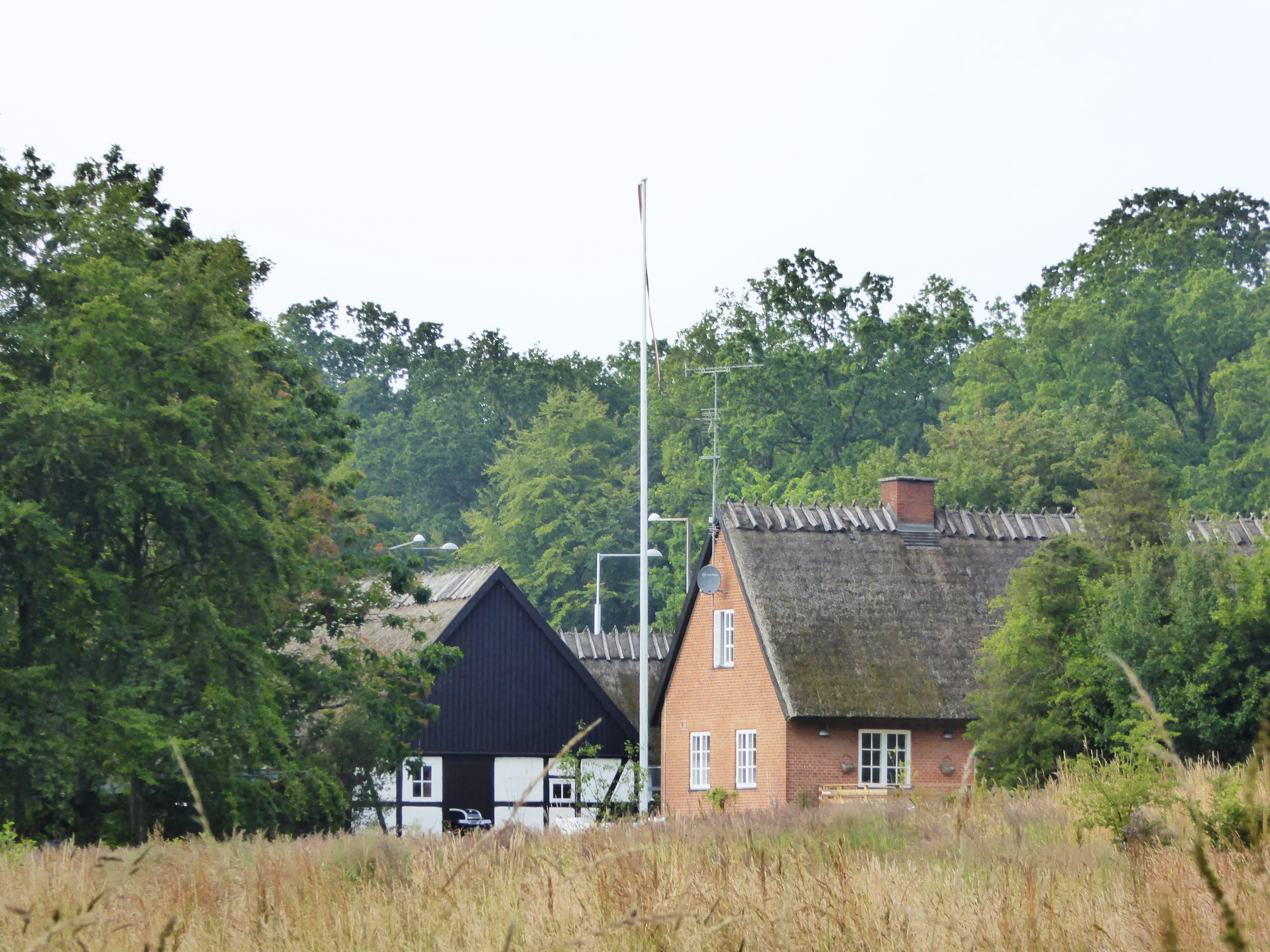
Hingsterhus

Although par force hunting was discontinued in 1777 by prohibition, the road system and numbered stone posts remain fully intact. Kongestenen (The King's Stone), a stone featuring Christian V's monogram and a compass rose, is located at Stjernen (The Star), an 8-way junction in the centre of the forest. The eight radial roads intersect a series of smaller paths called Etkorset (The One-Cross), Tokorset (The Two-Cross), Trekorset (The Three-Cross), etc.

The ruins after the pavilion and remains of the vegetation can still be seen on Fantasiens Ø. The forest also contains a number of old houses, so-called banghuse, which were originally used by the men who took care of the horses. They include Hingsterhus and Horsebohus.

== Activities ==
Store Dyrehave contains various facilities for camping and bonfires. There are also a 20 km mountain bike trail, an exercise trail and marked running routes (6, 10 and 20 km).

== See also ==
- Danish Museum of Hunting and Forestry
- List of protected areas of Hillerød Municipality
