= Ernst Schmiegelow =

Danish painter and politician

Ernst Carl August Schmiegelow
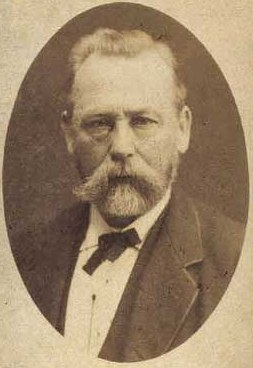
- Portrait of Schmiegelow, drawn by Adolph Lønborg circa 1875
- Born: 27 February 1826; Sorø, Denmark
- Died: 4 September 1888 (aged 62); Fredensborg, Denmark
- Known for: Painting, Politics

Ernst Carl August Schmiegelow (27 February 1826 – 4 September 1888), or just Ernst Schmiegelow, was a Danish master painter and politician.

== Childhood ==
Ernst Schmiegelow was born in Fuirendal, near Sorø, on 27 February 1826. His parents were Joachim Friedrich David Schmiegelow (1783–1830), a war assessor and doctor, and Anna Metta Edebohl, née Bøtcher (1792–1867).

In 1830, his father died, and he, his mother, and six siblings moved to Vordingborg, where Schmiegelow grew up in modest circumstances. He attended his town's Latin school until he was 14.

== Youth ==
After his Lutheran confirmation, Schmiegelow began training as a painter in Copenhagen. He was apprenticed to the widow of Master Painter Hambro at Gammel Strand, whose business at that time was managed by Master Painter J. Q. Harboe. Ernst learned to paint and attended the drawing school at the Royal Academy of Fine Arts.

In 1846, Schmiegelow became a journeyman and travelled abroad. He worked for some time in Leipzig, but reached Vienna later in 1846. In 1848, he returned from Vienna to volunteer in the First Schleswig War that had broken out in Denmark, despite plans to travel to Constantinople and Egypt.

Initially serving as a private soldier in the 2nd Jäger Corps, he took part in the campaign of the first year. However, he was not permitted to remain a volunteer: a law issued on 12 February 1849 made him liable for compulsory service, and he was drafted for the final two years of the campaign.

After the war had ended, Schmiegelow found employment with C. B. Lübschitz, for whom he carried out painting work on estates in Sweden and on Funen, as well as Old Carlsberg.

== Middle years and business ==
In 1853, Schmiegelow started his own roller blind manufacturing business (by means of lithography) in Copenhagen. The business was opened on Store Kongensgade, and he produced lithographed roller blinds, featuring landscapes, images of castles, and similar motifs. As this was something new at the time, the business prospered.

From 1853 until 1861, he worked in partnership with Andreas Frederik Dahl, an old friend of his, but after 1861 he ran the business alone. It quickly became one of the largest painting businesses in Copenhagen. Schmiegelow merged his business in 1884 with that of master painter C. C. Møllmann. At the beginning of 1888, Møllmann took full control of the business.

On 4 June 1858, Schmiegelow married Thecla Saurbrey, whom he had known since his youth in Vordingborg. The children born of his marriage all died in early childhood.

== Late life and politics ==
In 1861, Schmiegelow made an attempt to introduce standardized address boards in Copenhagen’s buildings, fitted with removable plates for each resident. Although Illustreret Tidende published an image of the "Schmiegelow address board" in January of that year, the idea did not catch on.

In 1872, Schmiegelow became a member of the representative council of the Painters’ Guild, a position he held until his death. In 1885, he helped establish a pension and support fund for the guild's journeymen, although the fund existed only for a short time due to legal changes.

Schmiegelow occupied several important public positions. In 1874, he joined the board of the Industrial Association. In 1879, he became a delegate to the Joint Representation for Danish Industry and Crafts. In 1881, he was appointed delegate to the board of the Technical Society, and was also sent as its delegate to the board of the Technical Society's School. He was subsequently elected to the school council, in which he held the position of chairman between 1886 and 1887.

In 1882, he became a member of the Copenhagen city council, and in 1883, he became chairman of the South Jutland Society.

In November 1884, he proposed that the mill on Helmers Bastion should remain standing and possibly be converted into a café. However, on that occasion, an article was submitted to Dagbladet which began with the phrase “Is Mr. Master Painter Schmiegelow a serious man?”

Additionally, in June 1886, Schmiegelow presented a plan for the regulation and planting of the shores of Peblinge Lake and Sortedams Lake. No actions were taken.

He also submitted a question to the magistracy regarding the condition of Copenhagen's fire brigade after the fire at Christiansborg Palace.

== Death ==
During his work on the Nordic Exhibition, as a delegate of the Industrial Association to the exhibition committee and chairman of its building committee, Schmiegelow became seriously ill. It was first thought to be typhus, but later it became clear that the illness was a pulmonary disease. He attempted to recover through travel and rest but was eventually forced to give up all work in May 1888. He died on 4 September 1888, in Fredensborg.
