= Marie Mørk =

Danish teacher and school founder (1861–1944)

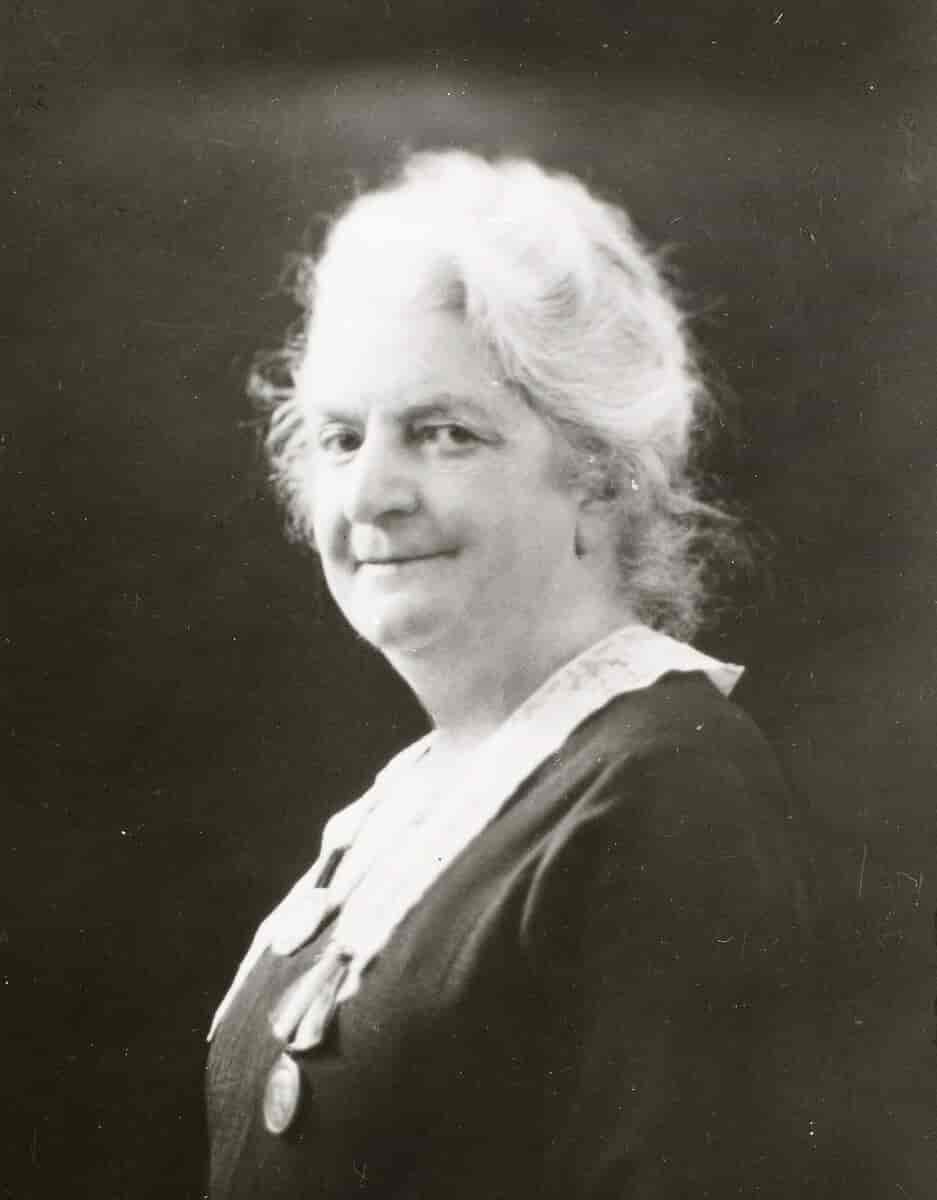
- Born: April 14, 1861; Copenhagen
- Died: May 30, 1944 (aged 83); Hillerød
- Occupation: Schoolteacher
- Years active: 1886–1930
- Known for: Established a girls school in Hillerød with innovative pedagogy
- Awards: Golden Medal of Merit

Anna Marie Frederikke Mørk (14 April 1861, Copenhagen—30 May 1944, Hillerød) was a Danish schoolteacher who is remembered for establishing a girls school in Hillerød in 1895. With the assistance of her sisters, she ran the school for over 40 years, introducing innovative pedagogical ideas. For her efforts, in 1920, she was honoured with the Golden Medal of Merit. The school continues to operate as a private school today.

== Early life and education ==
Born in Copenhagen on 14 April 1861, Anna Marie Frederikke Mørk (at baptism Mørch) was the daughter of the municipal road inspector Niels Peter Severin Mørch (1830–1911) and his wife Elsebeth Jacobine Elise née Pingel (1836–1911). In view of the poor school facilities available at the time, she was privately tutored in an untraditional but inspiring manner by the parish priest C. Hostrop together with some of her siblings and the priest's own children. She later attended N. Zahle's School in Copenhagen, obtaining a diploma as a schoolteacher when she was 24. She completed her education with a university assignment on how nature is depicted in Danish literature.

== Career ==
From 1886 to 1894, Mørk was employed as a teacher at the newly established Vældegård Kvindeskole (Vældegård Women's School) in Gentofte. As her interest grew in women's interests, in 1892 she served as a member of the common management board of the Danish Women's Society.

After deciding to run her own school, in 1895 with financial assistance from a friend as well as from the local authorities, Mørk was able to acquire Manna Lund's girls school in Hilleræd. In accordance with evolving requirements, she was able to have new premises completed over the next six months in the city's outskirts. As a result, on 2 September 1895 "M. Mørks skole og hjem for unge piger" (M. Mørk's School and Home for Young Girls) opened with 70 pupils, some of whom were boarders from distant parts of Denmark or from overseas. The school quickly gained a good reputation and by 1907, with the acquisition of two other private schools and a local state school, the premises had expanded and the primary section of the school was open to both boys and girls.

Mørk relied on the assistance of her younger sisters to run the school. Eva Mørch (1867–1942) helped with the boarding facilities and taught the younger children while Gudrun Mørch (1877–1960) also taught at the school from the start. All three sisters were involved in the women's movement. Especially in the first ten years when the school was limited to girls, Mørk's innovative teaching ideas included an examination-free class for older girls who were unable or did not wish take examinations. She also introduced less demanding classes for girls in puberty where they were mainly taught housekeeping skills. These ideas were inspired by her training at Zahle's School.

In 1930, under pressure to admit boys to the higher classes, Mørk chose to retire as head and hand over responsibility to Waldemar Stenberdt, explaining to him that she thought it was time for someone younger to run the school. For the next seven years, Stenberdt collaborated with Mørk who stayed on to run the boarding quarters. She had lived there herself for 42 years together with her sister Eva and two children adopted from her fourth sister Julie Feilberg (1867–1942) who had emigrated to Canada.

Marie Mørk died on 30 May 1944 in Hillerød where she is buried.

== Awards ==
For her contribution to Danish education, in 1920 Marie Mørk was honoured with the Golden Medal of Merit.
