= Edward Mørk =

Norwegian trade unionist and politician

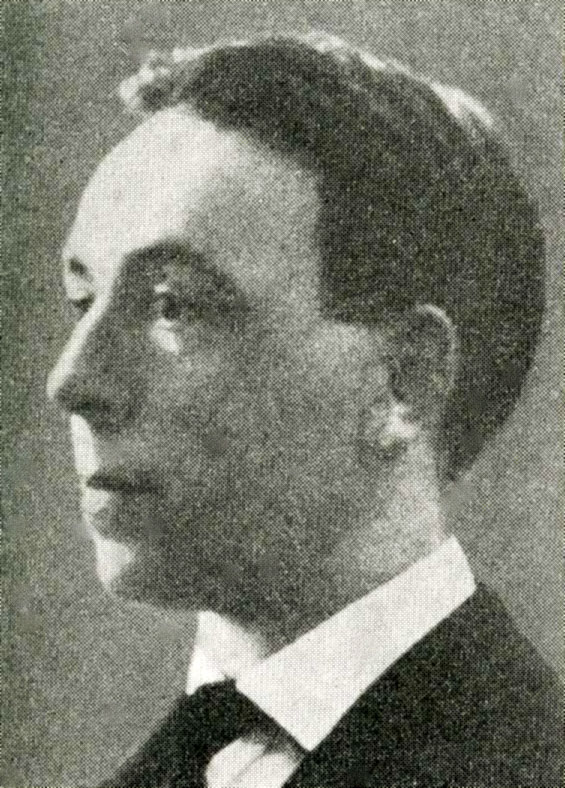
Edward Mørk

Edward Mørk (28 November 1888 – 1962) was a Norwegian trade unionist and politician for the Labour Party.

== Biography ==
He was a typographer by profession but entered politics via the Norges Socialdemokratiske Ungdomsforbund in 1906. He was the national leader of the organization in 1909, 1911, and 1914. He then chaired Oslo Faglige Samorg from 1920 to 1932 and was also a secretariat member of the Norwegian Confederation of Trade Unions from 1925 to 1927. He was a proponent of local trade union confederations (Norwegian: samorganisasjon). At the 1923 Norwegian Confederation of Trade Unions congress, he proposed that fourteen representatives from the local confederations get a place in the supervisory council. The proposal was voted down with 102 against 101 votes. From 1932 on, he led the Employment Office (Arbeidskontoret) in Oslo.

In 1934, he was excluded from the Labour Party for failing to deny accusations of corruption. He died in 1962.
