= Trustrup railway station =

Railway station in East Jutland, Denmark

Trustrup
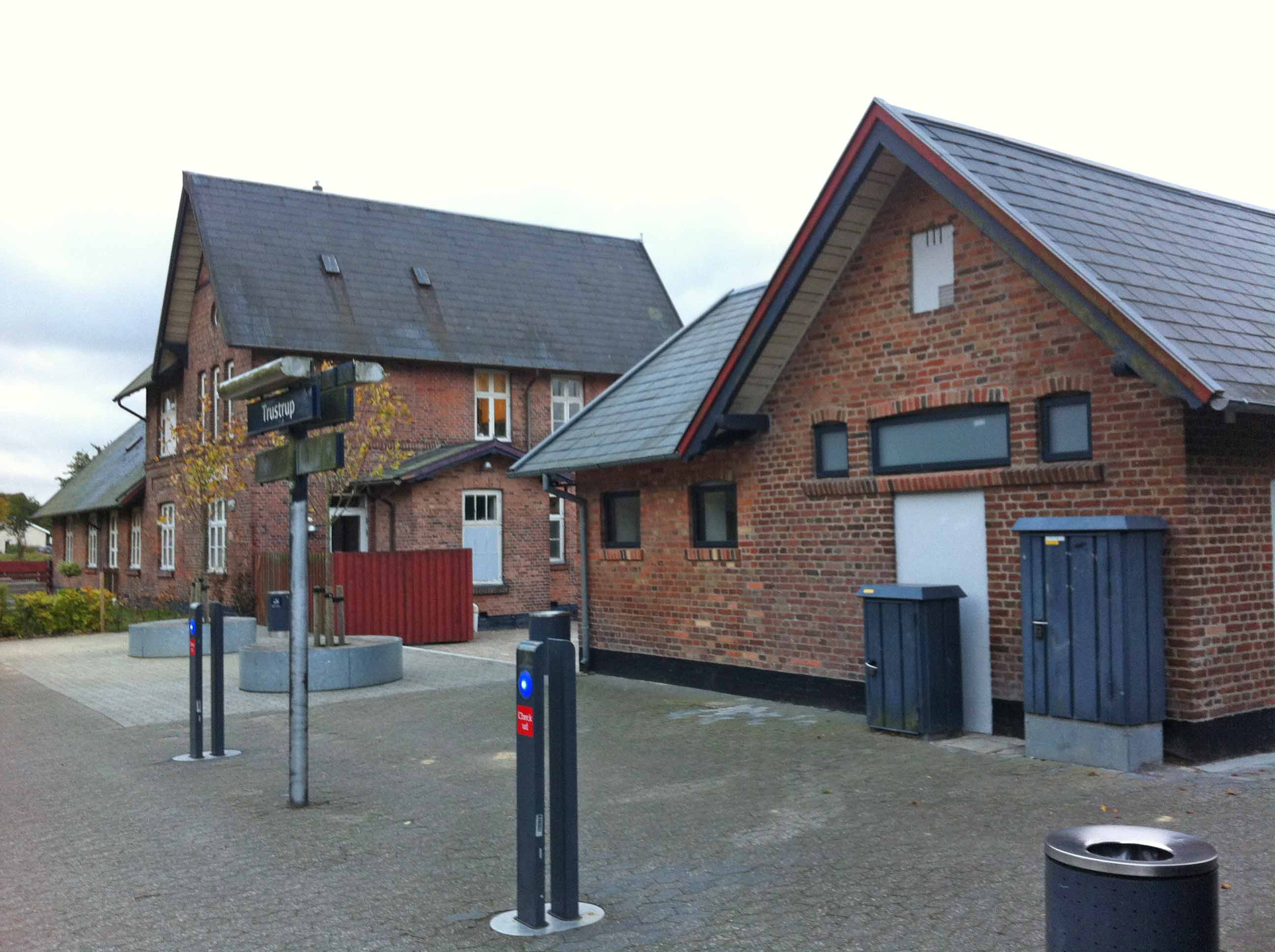
- Trustrup station in 2016

General information
- Location: Stationsgade 21; 8570 Trustrup; Norddjurs Municipality; Denmark
- Coordinates: 56°21′2.5″N 10°46′19″E
- Elevation: 31.4 metres (103 ft)
- Owner: Banedanmark
- Operator: Aarhus Letbane
- Lines: Grenaa Line (since 1876); Ebeltoft Line (1901–1968)
- Platforms: 1
- Tracks: 1

Construction
- Architect: Niels Peder Christian Holsøe

History
- Opened: 26 August 1876

Services
Preceding station	Aarhus Letbane	Following station
Kolind towards Odder or Mårslet	Line 1	Hessel towards Grenaa or Hornslet
Location

Trustrup station is a railway station serving the village of Trustrup on the Djursland peninsula in East Jutland, Denmark.

The station is located on the Grenaa railway line between Aarhus and Grenaa. It opened in 1886 with the opening of the Randers-Ryomgaard-Grenaa Line. From 1901 to 1968 it was also the northern terminus of the Ebeltoft railway line between Trustrup and Ebeltoft. Since 2019, the station has been served by the Aarhus light rail system, a tram-train network combining tram lines in the city of Aarhus with operation on railway lines in the surrounding countryside.

== History ==
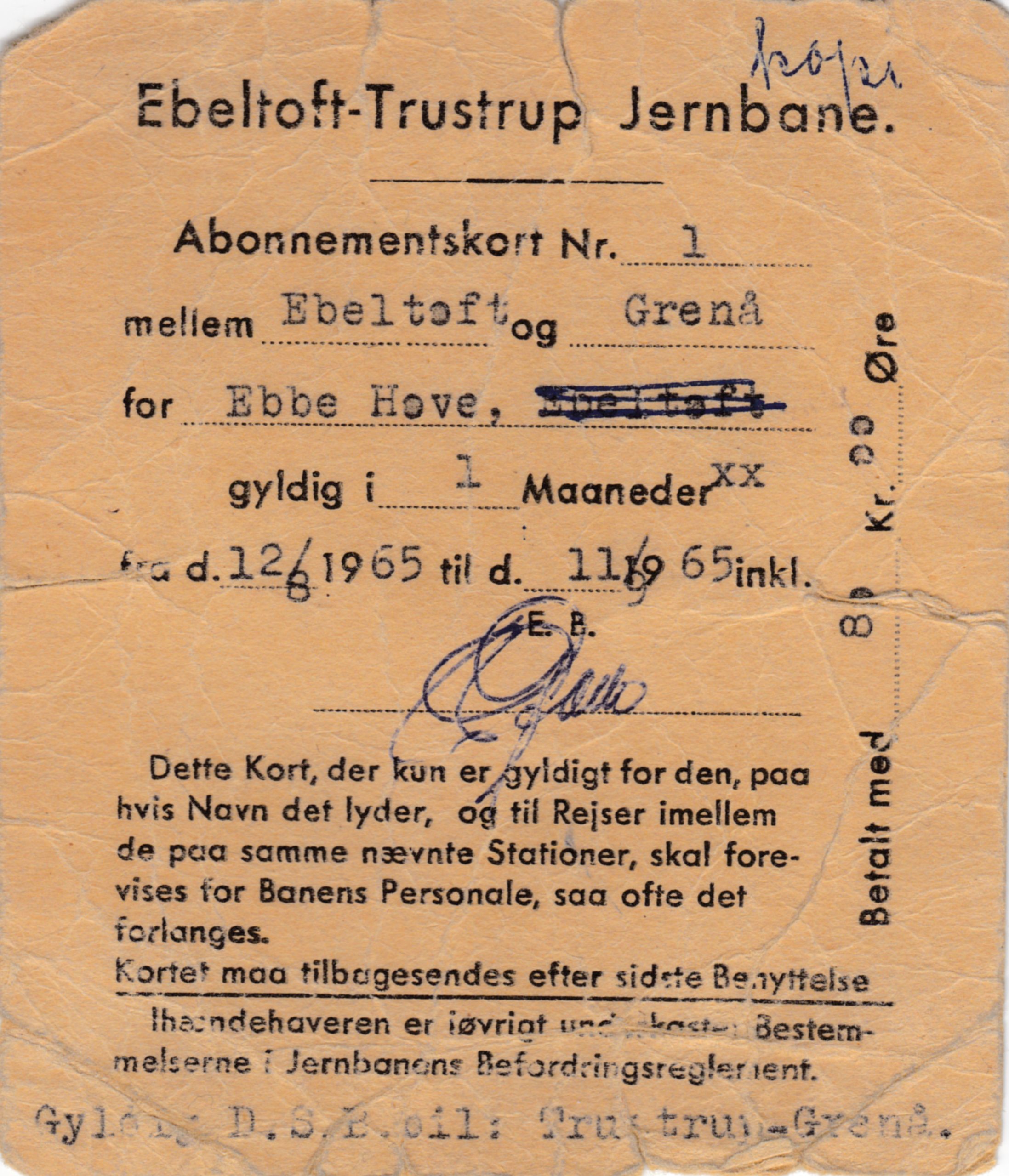
Subscription card to the Ebeltoft-Trustrup railway and the DSB bus Trustup-Grenå, valid from August 12, 1965.

The station opened on 26 August 1876 as the railway company Østjyske Jernbane (ØJJ) opened the railway line Randers-Ryomgaard-Grenaa from Randers to Grenaa. In 1877, ØJJ opened a branch line from Ryomgård to Aarhus, and just a few years later the trains starting running directly between Grenaa and Aarhus, with the Ryomgård-Randers section being reduced to a branch line used mostly for rail freight transport until it was closed altogether on 2 May 1971.

In 1901, Trustrup station became the northern terminus of the Ebeltoft Line to the town of Ebeltoft. From 1932, however, all trains on the Ebeltoft Line were continued on the tracks on the Grenaa Line from Trustrup to Grenaa. The Ebeltoft Line was closed in 1968.

From 2016 to 2019, the station was temporarily closed along with the Grenaa railway line while it was being reconstructed and electrified to form part of the Aarhus light rail system, a tram-train network combining tram lines in the city of Aarhus with operation on railway lines in the surrounding countryside. Since 2019, the station has been served by Line L1 of the Aarhus light rail network, operated by the multinational transportation company Keolis.

== Architecture ==
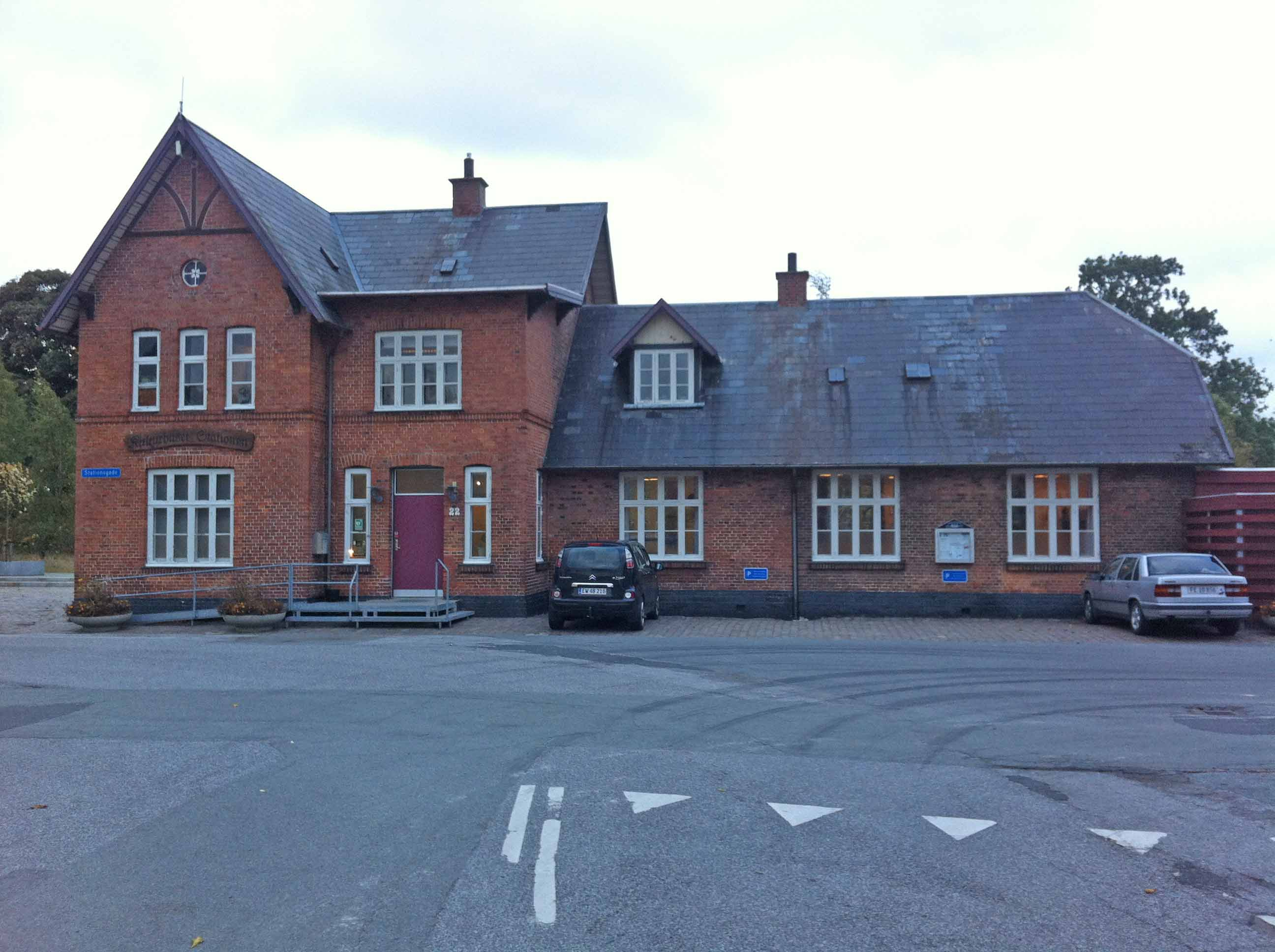
Facade of Trustrup station in 2016.

The station building from 1876 was designed by the Danish architect Niels Peder Christian Holsøe (1826–1895), known for the numerous railway stations he designed across Denmark in his capacity of head architect of the Danish State Railways.

== See also ==
- List of railway stations in Denmark
- Rail transport in Denmark
