= Kolind railway station =

Railway station in East Jutland, Denmark

Kolind
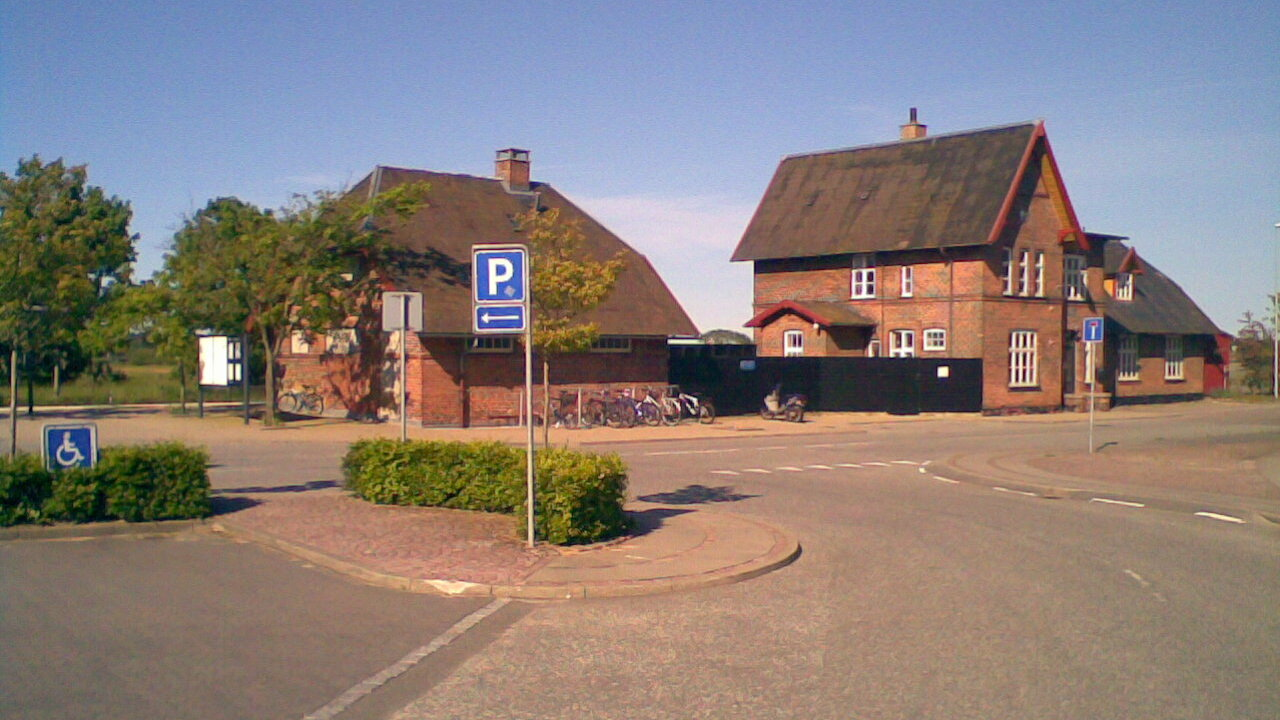
- Front facade of Kolind station

General information
- Location: Drasbekgade 16; 8560 Kolind; Syddjurs Municipality; Denmark
- Coordinates: 56°21′46″N 10°35′17″E
- Elevation: 3.3 metres (11 ft)
- Owner: Banedanmark
- Operator: Aarhus Letbane
- Line: Grenaa Line
- Platforms: 1
- Tracks: 1

Construction
- Architect: Niels Peder Christian Holsøe

History
- Opened: 26 August 1876

Services
Preceding station	Aarhus Letbane	Following station
Ryomgård towards Odder or Mårslet	Line 1	Trustrup towards Grenaa or Hornslet
Location

Kolind station is a railway station serving the railway town of Kolind on the Djursland peninsula in Jutland, Denmark.

The station is located on the Grenaa railway line between Aarhus and Grenaa. It was opened in 1876 with the opening of the Randers-Ryomgaard-Grenaa Line.

Since 2019, the station has been served by the Aarhus light rail system, a tram-train network combining tram lines in the city of Aarhus with operation on railway lines in the surrounding countryside.

== History ==
The station opened on 26 August 1876 as the railway company Østjyske Jernbane (ØJJ) opened the railway line Randers-Ryomgaard-Grenaa from Randers to Grenaa. In 1877, ØJJ opened a branch line from Ryomgård to Aarhus, and just a few years later the trains starting running directly between Grenaa and Aarhus, with the Ryomgård-Randers section being reduced to a branch line used mostly for rail freight transport until it was closed altogether on 2 May 1971.

From 2016 to 2019, the station was temporarily closed along with the Grenaa railway line while it was being reconstructed and electrified to form part of the Aarhus light rail system, a tram-train network combining tram lines in the city of Aarhus with operation on railway lines in the surrounding countryside. Since 2019, the station has been served by Line L1 of the Aarhus light rail network, operated by the multinational transportation company Keolis.

== Architecture ==
The station building from 1876 was designed by the Danish architect Niels Peder Christian Holsøe (1826–1895), known for the numerous railway stations he designed across Denmark in his capacity of head architect of the Danish State Railways.

== See also ==
- List of railway stations in Denmark
- Rail transport in Denmark
