= Thorsager railway station =

Railway station in East Jutland, Denmark

Thorsager
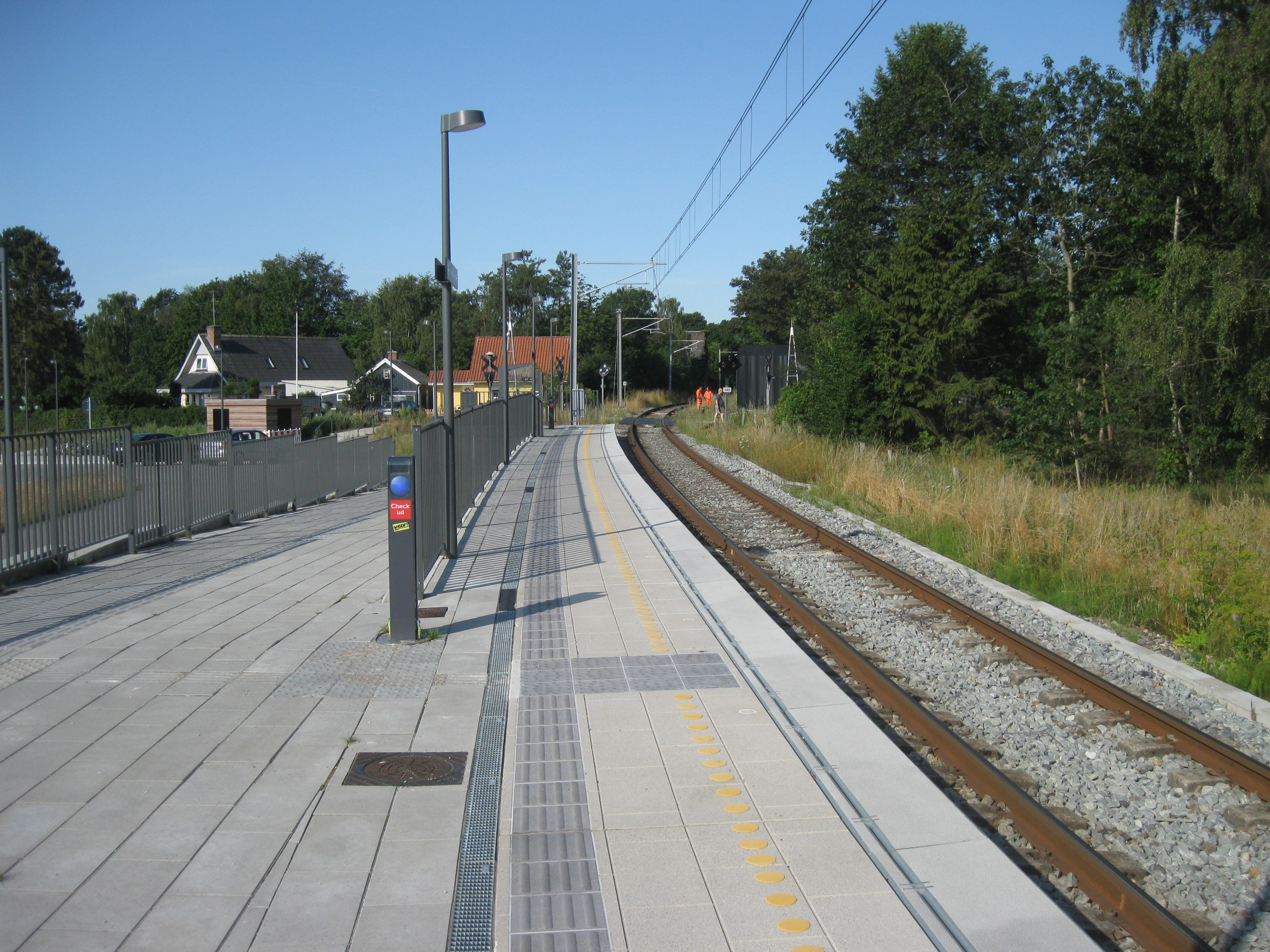
- Thorsager station in 2019

General information
- Location: Stationsvej 48; Thorsager, 8410 Rønde; Syddjurs Municipality; Denmark
- Coordinates: 56°21′22″N 10°26′53″E
- Elevation: 12.4 metres (41 ft)
- Owner: Banedanmark
- Operator: Aarhus Letbane
- Line: Grenaa Line
- Platforms: 1
- Tracks: 1

Construction
- Architect: Niels Peder Christian Holsøe

History
- Opened: 1 December 1877; 30 April 2019
- Closed: 22 May 1971

Services
Preceding station	Aarhus Letbane	Following station
Mørke towards Odder or Mårslet	Line 1	Ryomgård towards Grenaa or Hornslet
Location

Thorsager station is a railway station serving the railway town of Thorsager on the peninsula of Djursland in Jutland, Denmark.

The station is located on the Grenaa railway line between Aarhus and Grenaa. It opened in 1877 with the opening of the Aarhus-Ryomgård section of the railway line. It was closed in 1971, but reopened in 2019, since when the station has been served by the Aarhus light rail system, a tram-train network combining tram lines in the city of Aarhus with operation on railway lines in the surrounding countryside.

== History ==
The station opened on 1 December 1877 as the railway company Østjyske Jernbane (ØJJ) opened a branch line From Aarhus to Ryomgård on the Randers-Ryomgaard-Grenaa Line from Randers to Grenaa. Just a few years later the trains starting running directly between Grenaa and Aarhus, with the Ryomgård-Randers section being reduced to a branch line used mostly for rail freight transport until it was closed altogether on 2 May 1971.

The station became unstaffed on 27 September 1964, and closed altogether 22 May 1971. It reopened on 30 April 2019, after the Grenaa railway line had been reconstructed and electrified to form part of the Aarhus light rail system, a tram-train network combining tram lines in the city of Aarhus with operation on railway lines in the surrounding countryside. Since 2019, the station has been served by Line L1 of the Aarhus light rail network, operated by the multinational transportation company Keolis.

== Architecture ==
The station building from 1877 was designed by the Danish architect Niels Peder Christian Holsøe (1826–1895), known for the numerous railway stations he designed across Denmark in his capacity of head architect of the Danish State Railways.

== See also ==
- List of railway stations in Denmark
- Rail transport in Denmark
