= Hessel railway station =

Railway halt in East Jutland, Denmark

Hessel
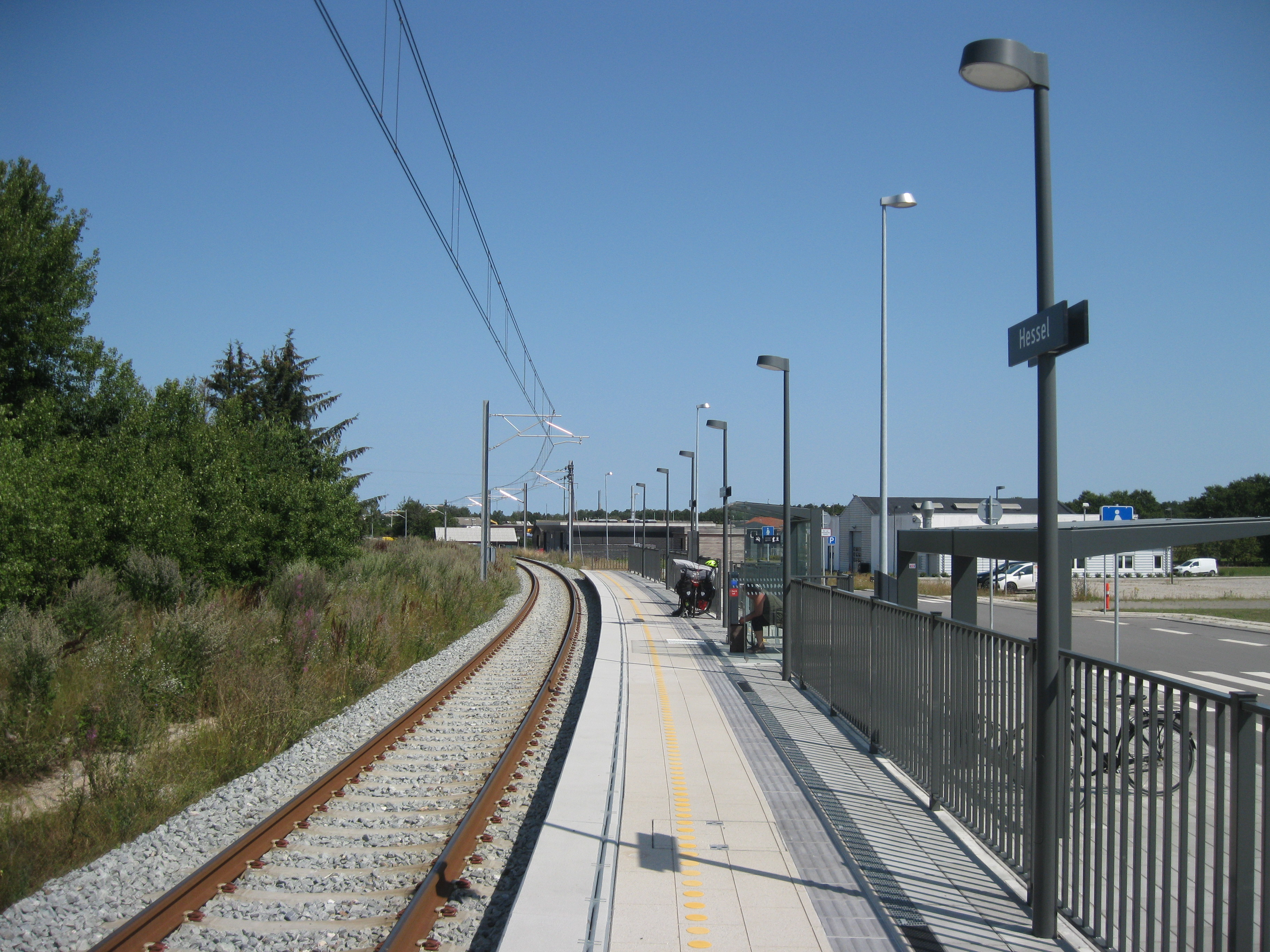
- Hessel station in 2019

General information
- Location: Rugvænget, 8500 Grenaa; Norddjurs Municipality; Denmark
- Coordinates: 56°23′24″N 10°52′19″E
- Elevation: 5.1 metres (17 ft)
- Operator: Keolis
- Line: Grenaa Line
- Platforms: 1
- Tracks: 1

History
- Opened: 9 July 2019

Services
Preceding station	Aarhus Letbane	Following station
Trustrup towards Odder or Mårslet	Line 1	Grenaa towards Grenaa or Hornslet
Location

Hessel station is a railway station serving the southern part of the town and seapor of Grenaa on the Djursland peninsula in East Jutland, Denmark.

The station is located on the Grenaa Line between Aarhus and Grenaa. It opened in 2019 shortly after the opening of the Aarhus Light Rail service on the Grenaa Line.

== See also ==
- List of railway stations in Denmark
