= Trustrup =

- Railway town
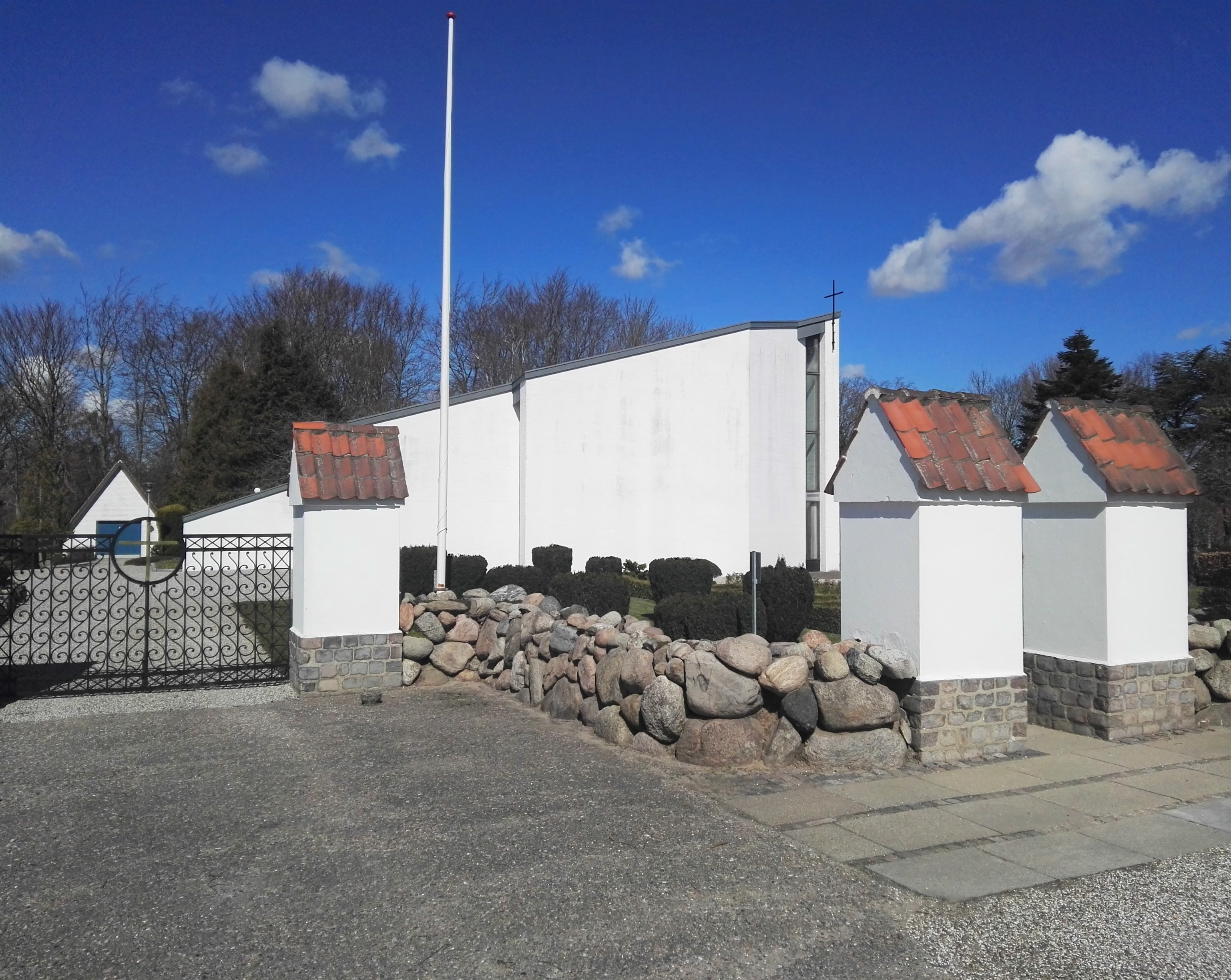
- Trustrup Church

- Location in Central Denmark Region Trustrup (Denmark)
- Coordinates: 56°20′52″N 10°46′12″E
- Country: Denmark
- Region: Central Denmark (Midt Jylland)
- Municipality: Norddjurs Municipality
- Parish: Lyngby Parish

Population (2026)
  - Total: 785

Trustrup is a small railway town, with a population of 785 (1 January 2026), in Norddjurs Municipality, Central Denmark Region in Denmark. It is located 21 km east of Ryomgård, 21 km north of Ebeltoft and 13 km southwest of the municipal seat Grenaa.

Trustrup is served by Trustrup railway station on the Grenaa Line between Aarhus and Grenaa.

Trustrup Church is the most modern church of Djursland finished in 1988 as an affiliated church in Lyngby Parish. The parish church, Lyngby Church, is located in the village of Lyngby 2 km northwest of Trustrup.
