= Mørke railway station =

Railway station in East Jutland, Denmark

Mørke
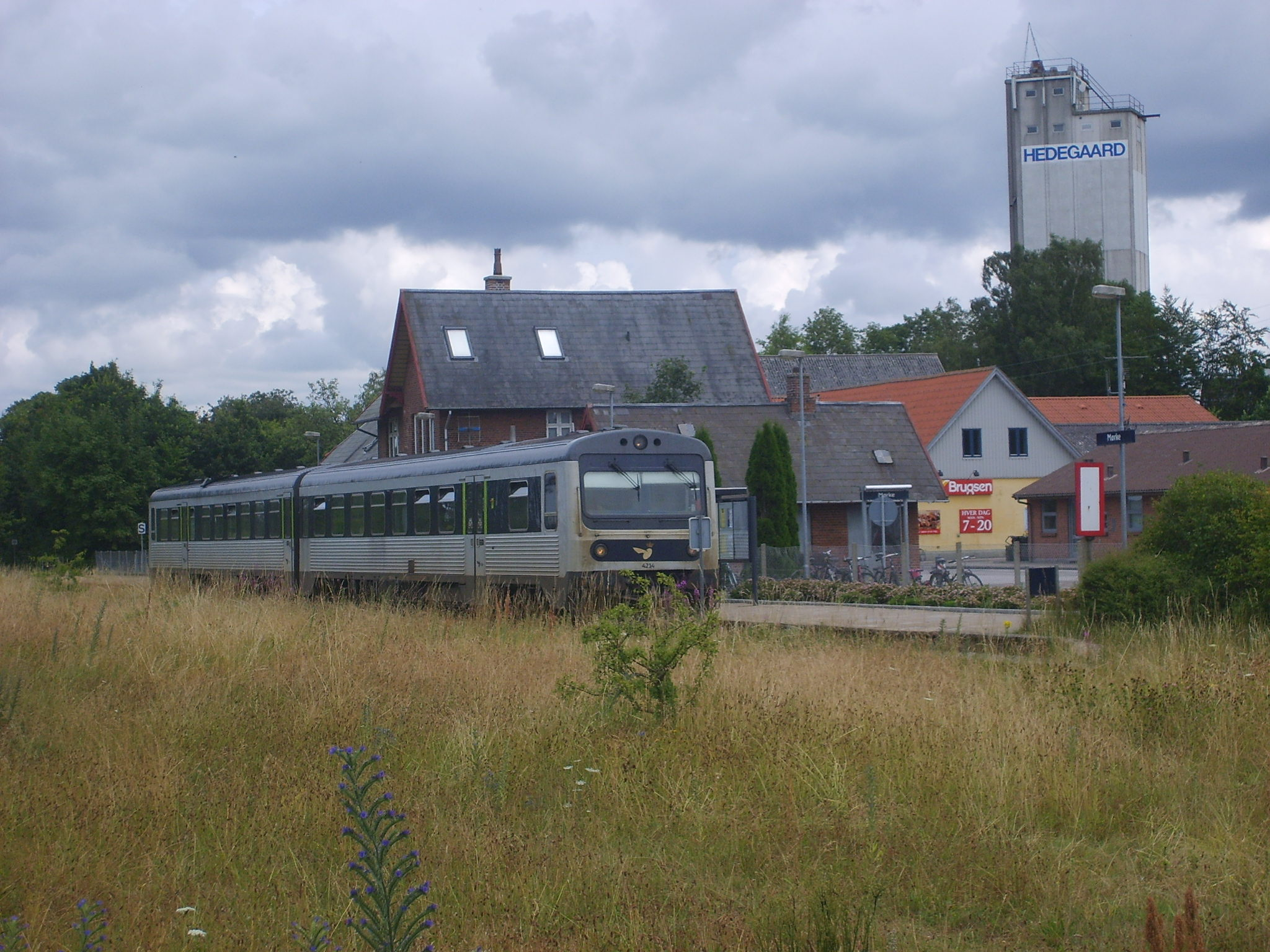
- Mørke station in 2010

General information
- Location: Stationsvej 3; 8544 Mørke; Syddjurs Municipality; Denmark
- Coordinates: 56°20′22″N 10°22′35″E
- Elevation: 33.0 metres (108.3 ft)
- Owner: Banedanmark
- Operator: Aarhus Letbane
- Line: Grenaa Line
- Platforms: 1
- Tracks: 1

Construction
- Architect: Niels Peder Christian Holsøe

History
- Opened: 1 December 1877

Services
Preceding station	Aarhus Letbane	Following station
Hornslet towards Odder or Mårslet	Line 1	Thorsager towards Grenaa or Hornslet
Location

Mørke station is a railway station serving the railway town of Mørke on the peninsula of Djursland in Jutland, Denmark.

The station is located on the Grenaa railway line between Aarhus and Grenaa. It opened in 1877 with the opening of the Aarhus-Ryomgård section of the railway line. Since 2019, the station has been served by the Aarhus light rail system, a tram-train network combining tram lines in the city of Aarhus with operation on railway lines in the surrounding countryside.

== History ==
The station opened on 1 December 1877 as the railway company Østjyske Jernbane (ØJJ) opened a branch line From Aarhus to Ryomgård on the Randers-Ryomgaard-Grenaa Line from Randers to Grenaa. Just a few years later the trains starting running directly between Grenaa and Aarhus, with the Ryomgård-Randers section being reduced to a branch line used mostly for rail freight transport until it was closed altogether on 2 May 1971.

From 2016 to 2019, the station was temporarily closed along with the Grenaa railway line while it was being reconstructed and electrified to form part of the Aarhus light rail system, a tram-train network combining tram lines in the city of Aarhus with operation on railway lines in the surrounding countryside. Since 2019, the station has been served by Line L1 of the Aarhus light rail network, operated by the multinational transportation company Keolis.

== Architecture ==
The station building from 1877 was designed by the Danish architect Niels Peder Christian Holsøe (1826–1895), known for the numerous railway stations he designed across Denmark in his capacity of head architect of the Danish State Railways.

== See also ==
- List of railway stations in Denmark
- Rail transport in Denmark
