= Ryomgård railway station =

Railway station in East Jutland, Denmark

Ryomgård
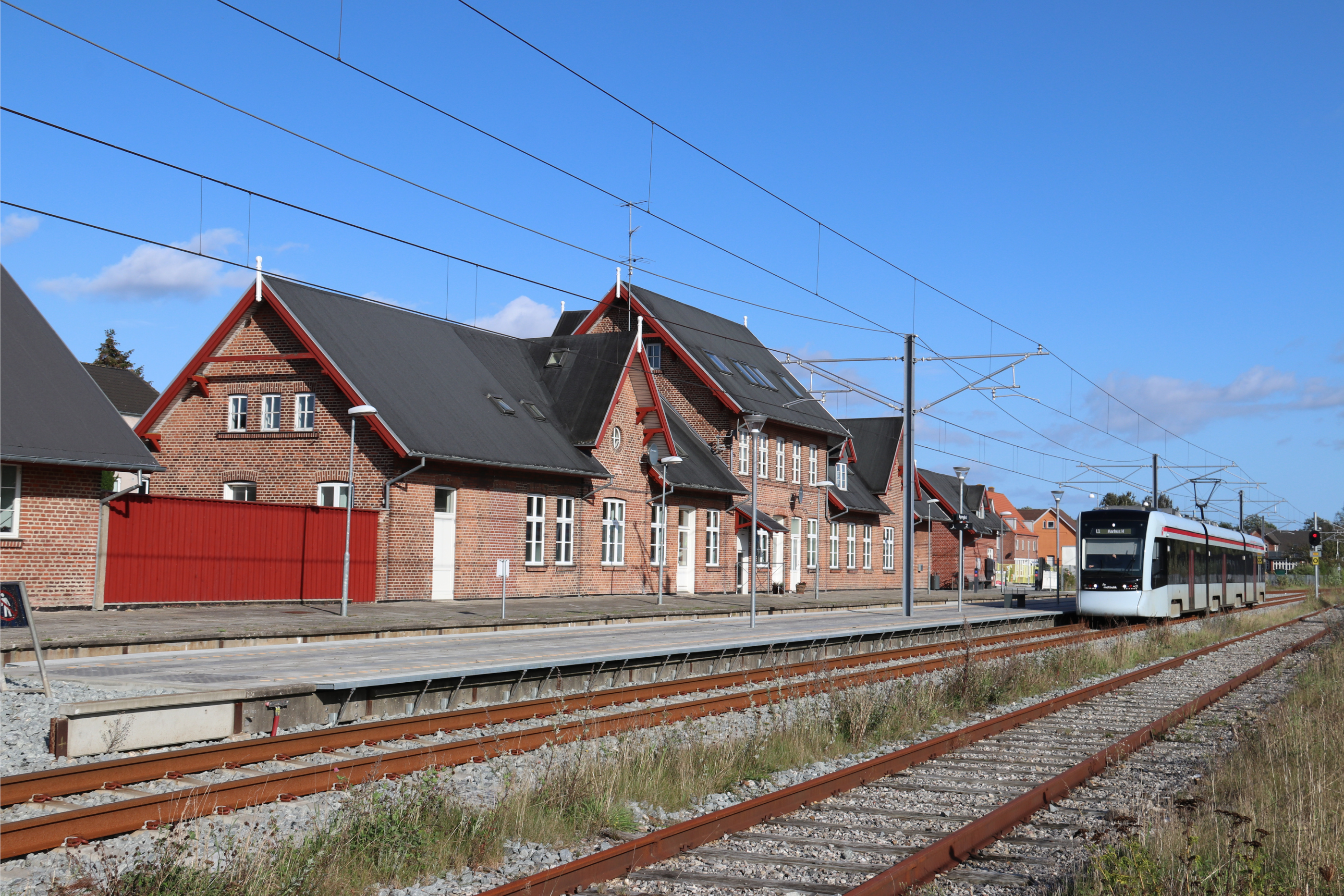
- Ryomgård station (2019)

General information
- Location: Jernbanegade 12; 8550 Ryomgård; Syddjurs Municipality; Denmark
- Coordinates: 56°22′48″N 10°30′02″E
- Elevation: 9.0 metres (29.5 ft)
- System: railway station
- Owner: Banedanmark
- Operator: Aarhus Letbane
- Line: Grenaa Line
- Platforms: 2
- Tracks: 2

Construction
- Architect: Niels Peder Christian Holsøe

History
- Opened: 26 August 1876

Services
Preceding station	Aarhus Letbane	Following station
Thorsager towards Odder or Mårslet	Line 1	Kolind towards Grenaa or Hornslet
Location
- Location within Central Denmark Region Location within Denmark

Ryomgård station is a railway station serving the railway town of Ryomgård on the peninsula of Djursland in Jutland, Denmark.

The station is located on the Grenaa railway line between Aarhus and Grenaa. It opened in 1876 with the opening of the Randers-Ryomgaard-Grenaa Line. Since 2019, the station has been served by the Aarhus light rail system, a tram-train network combining tram lines in the city of Aarhus with operation on railway lines in the surrounding countryside.

== History ==
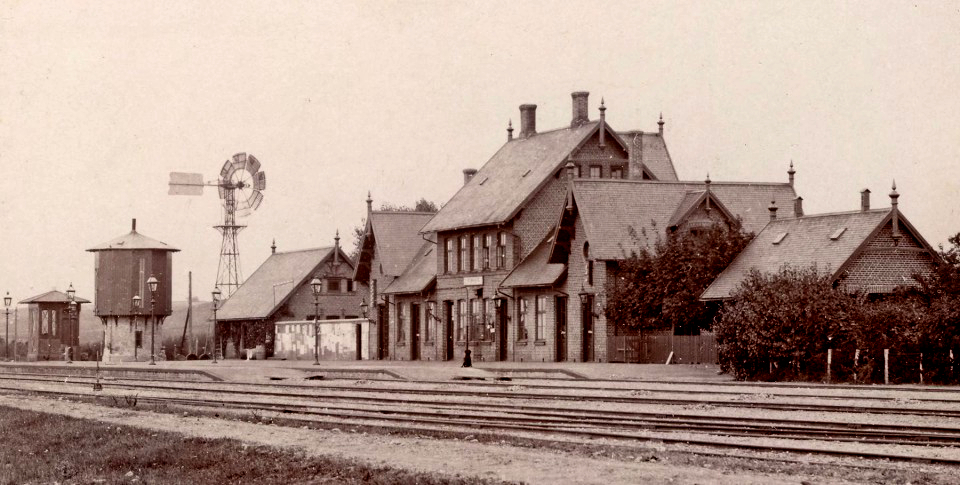
Ryomgård station in 1890.

The station opened on 26 August 1876 as the railway company Østjyske Jernbane (ØJJ) opened the railway line Randers-Ryomgaard-Grenaa from Randers to Grenaa. In 1877, ØJJ opened a branch line from Ryomgård to Aarhus, and just a few years later the trains starting running directly between Grenaa and Aarhus, with the Ryomgård-Randers section being reduced to a branch line used mostly for rail freight transport until it was closed altogether on 2 May 1971.

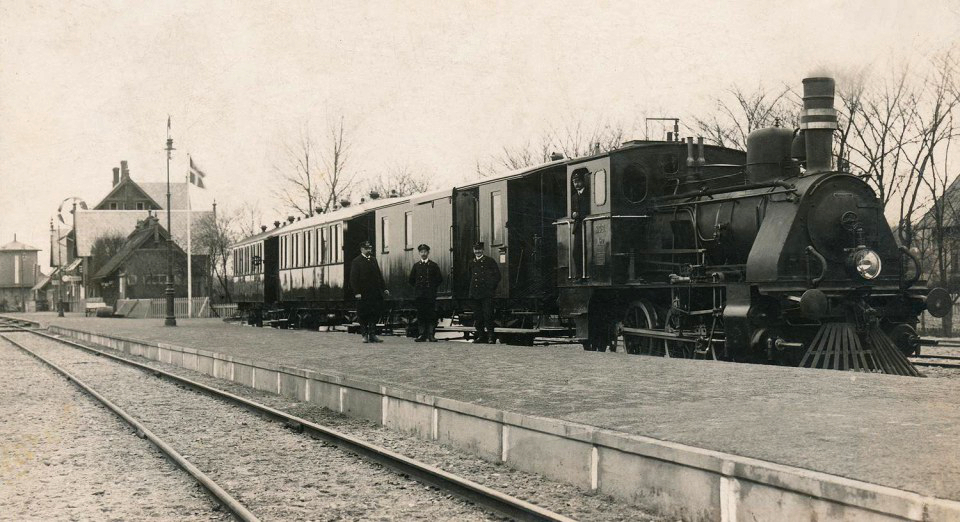
Train on the Ryomgård-Gjerrild Line's platform at Ryomgård station in 1911.

In 1911, another railway line from Ryomgård to the north of Djursland was added, making Ryomgård a railway hub on Djursland, when Ryomgård station became the southern terminus of the Ryomgård-Gjerrild Line from Ryomgård to the town of Gjerrild, which in 1917 was prolonged from Gjerrild to Grenaa. The Ryomgård-Gjerrild-Grenaa Line was closed in 1956.

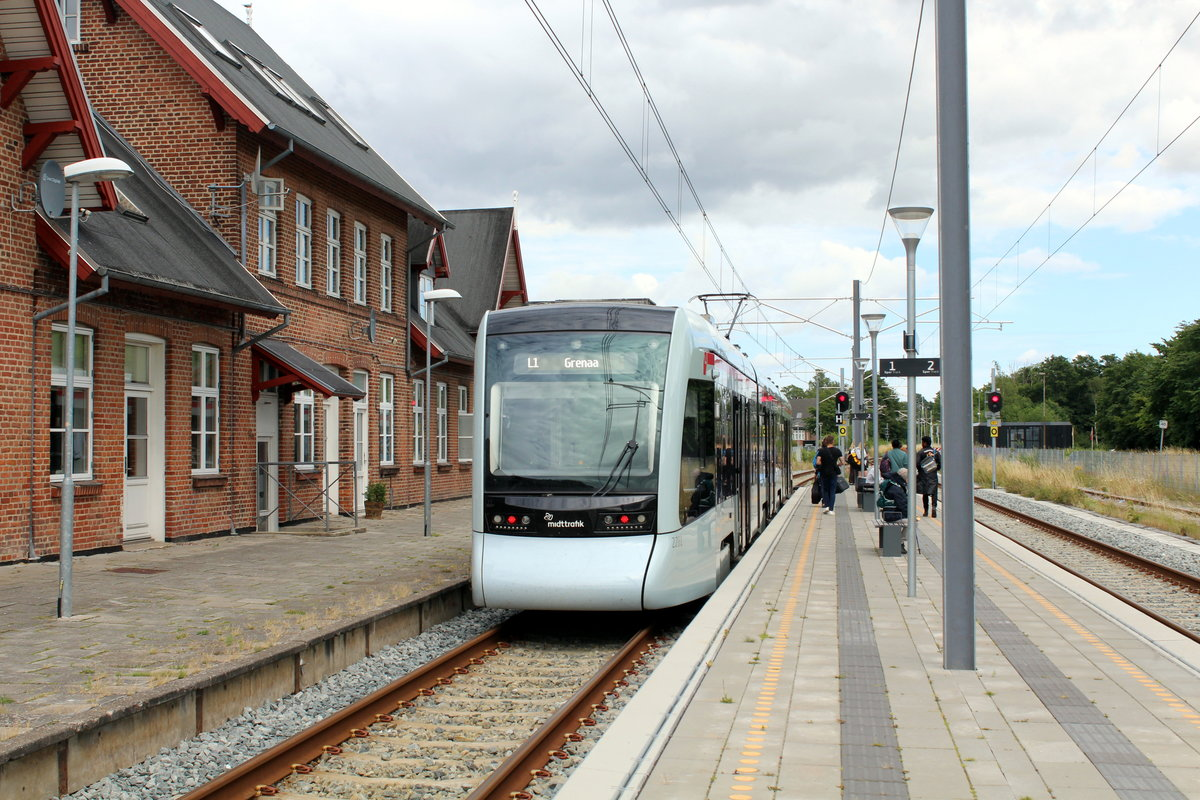
Train from Aarhus light rail at Ryomgård station in 2020.

From 2016 to 2019, the station was temporarily closed along with the Grenaa railway line while it was being reconstructed and electrified to form part of the Aarhus light rail system, a tram-train network combining tram lines in the city of Aarhus with operation on railway lines in the surrounding countryside. Since 2019, the station has been served by Line L1 of the Aarhus light rail network, operated by the multinational transportation company Keolis.

== Architecture ==
The station building from 1876 was designed by the Danish architect Niels Peder Christian Holsøe (1826–1895), known for the numerous railway stations he designed across Denmark in his capacity of head architect of the Danish State Railways.

== See also ==
- List of railway stations in Denmark
- Rail transport in Denmark
