= Thorsager =

- Town
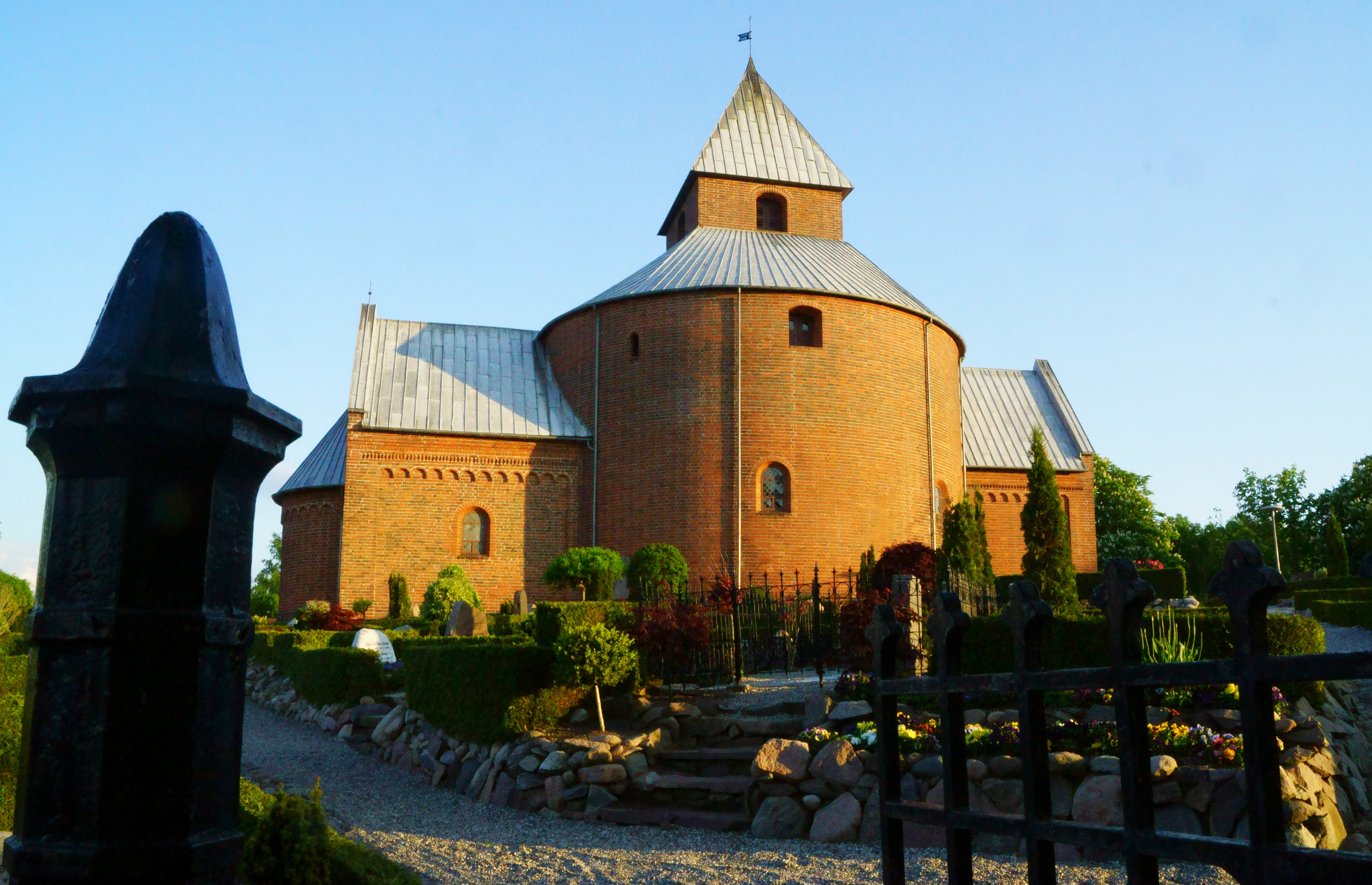
- Round church of Thorsager

- Location in Denmark Thorsager (Central Denmark Region)
- Coordinates: 56°20′39″N 10°27′28″E
- Country: Denmark
- Region: Central Denmark (Midtjylland)
- Municipality: Syddjurs

Area
  - Urban: 0.9 km^{2} (0.35 sq mi)

Population (2026)
  - Urban: 1,400
  - Urban density: 1,600/km^{2} (4,000/sq mi)
- Time zone: UTC+1 (Central European Time)
  - Summer (DST): UTC+2 (Central European Summer Time)

Thorsager is a small town in Jutland, Denmark with a population of 1,400 (1 January 2026 census), located in Thorsager Parish, 6 km north of Rønde. The town lies in Syddjurs Municipality and lies in the Central Denmark Region. Thorsager is especially known for its church, which is Jutland's only round church. It was built around 1200.

Thorsager is served by Thorsager railway station, located on the Grenaa railway line between Aarhus and Grenaa.

== Name ==
Thorsager is Danish for "Thor's Acre" a reference to the Norse God Thor.

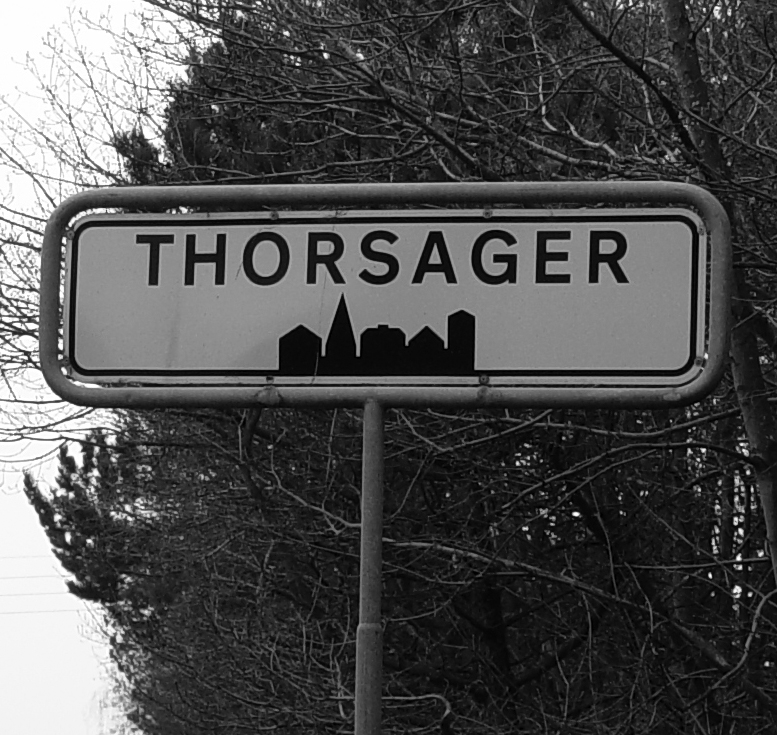
Thorsager City Limit Sign
