= Gammel Ryomgård =

Building in Syddjurs, Denmark

Coordinates: 56°22′39″N 10°30′16″E

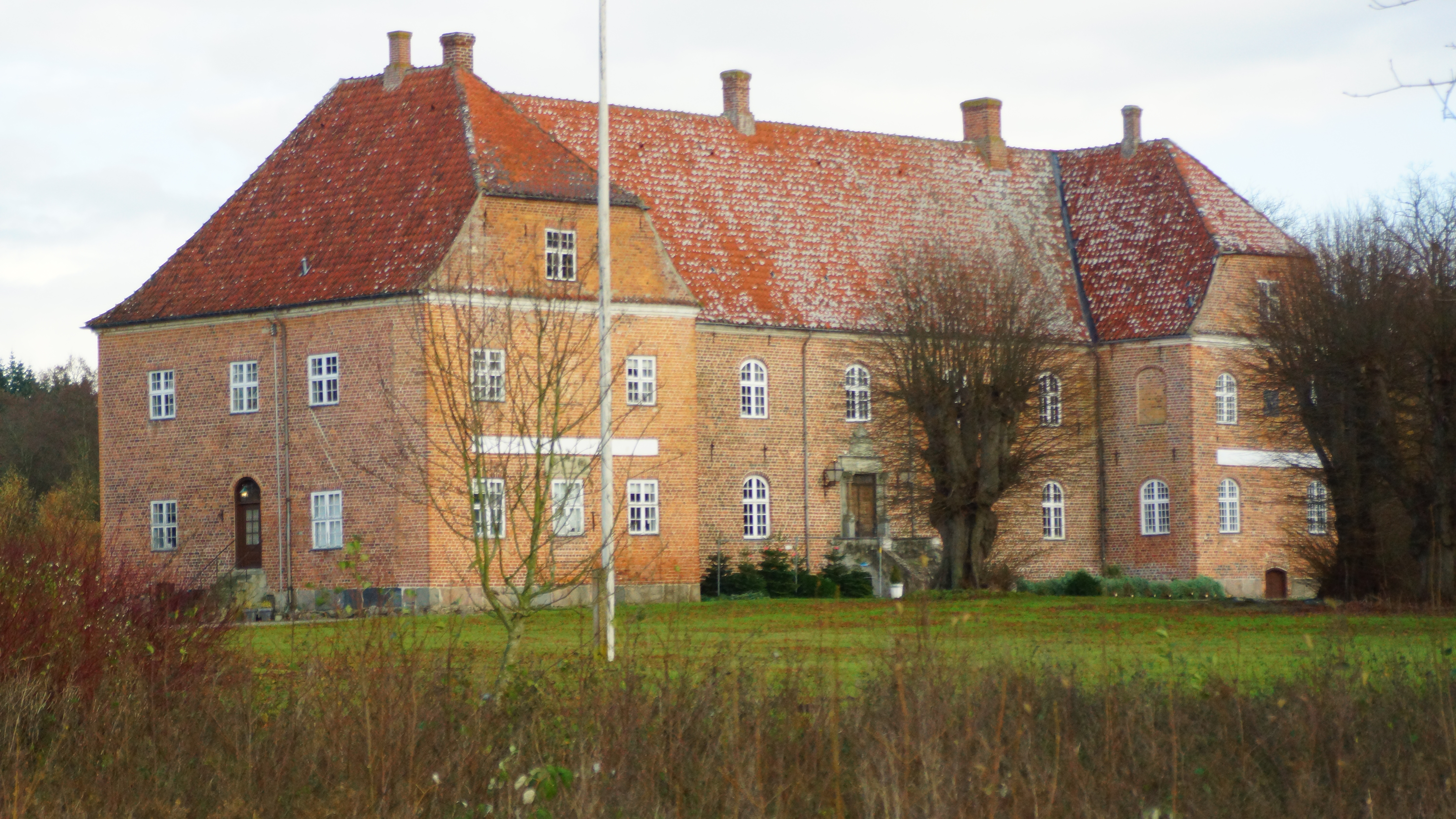
Gammel Ryomgård

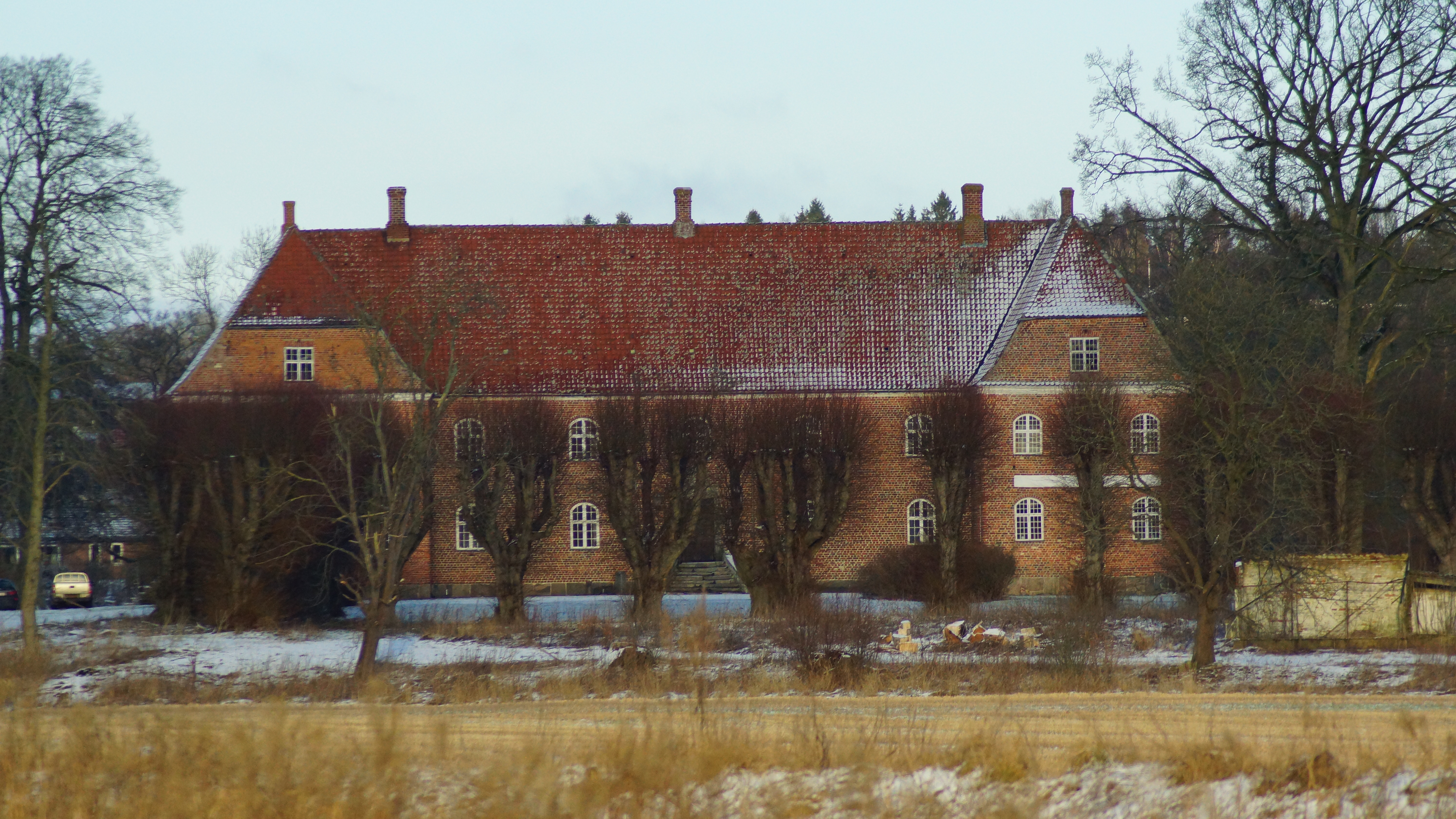
Gammel Ryomgård

Gammel Ryomgård is a manor house located in Syddjurs Municipality, Denmark.

== History ==
The main building was built in 1643 and rebuilt in 1768–1770. Gammel Ryomgård was known as Ryomgaard in 1576 and called Gammel Ryomgaard from 1804, when a much of the land was sold and converted into separate farms. The new farms received the names Ny Ryomgaard (New Ryomgård) (originally Karlsruhe), Marienhøj (originally Marienhof), Frederikslund (originally Kragelund) and Margrethelund.

Today Gammel Ryomgård has 107 hectare of land. The building is protected.

During the Middle Ages, there was a toll-passage that crossed the lowlands of the former Kolind Sound (Kolindsund) at Gammel Ryomgård. Djursland, the northern part of the peninsula, was separated from the southern part by the sound. With the construction of the Grenaa Line (Grenaabanen) in the 1870s, the foundation was created for the town of Ryomgård, which grew up west and east of Gammel Ryomgård.

== Recent owners of Gammel Ryomgård ==
- (1854–1902) Christian Helenus Mourier-Petersen
- (1902) Carl Vilhelm Behagen Castenschiold
- (1902–1912) Adolf Frederik Holten Castenschiold
- (1912–1941) Jørgen Carl greve Scheel
- (1941–1945) Johannes Fogh-Nielsen
- (1945–1953) Enkefru Fogh-Nielsen
- (1953–1975) Ove Nielsen
- (1975–1985) Enkefru Else Nielsen
- (1985–2001) Else Voldstedlund
- (2001–present) Frank Voldstedlund
