= Kolind =

- Town
- Location in Denmark Kolind (Central Denmark Region)
- Coordinates: 56°21′37″N 10°34′59″E
- Country: Denmark
- Region: Central Denmark (Østjylland)
- Municipality: Syddjurs Municipality

Area
  - Urban: 1.4 km^{2} (0.54 sq mi)

Population (2026)
  - Urban: 1,923
  - Urban density: 1,400/km^{2} (3,600/sq mi)
- Time zone: UTC+1 (CET)
  - Summer (DST): UTC+2 (CEST)
- Postal code: DK-8560 Kolind

Kolind is a railway town, with a population of 1,923 (as of 1 January 2026), in Syddjurs Municipality, Central Denmark Region in Denmark.

Kolind was the municipal seat of the former Midtdjurs Municipality until 1 January 2007.

== Geography ==
Kolind is situated in central Djursland at the western end of the drained lakebed of Kolindsund.

== Kolind Church ==
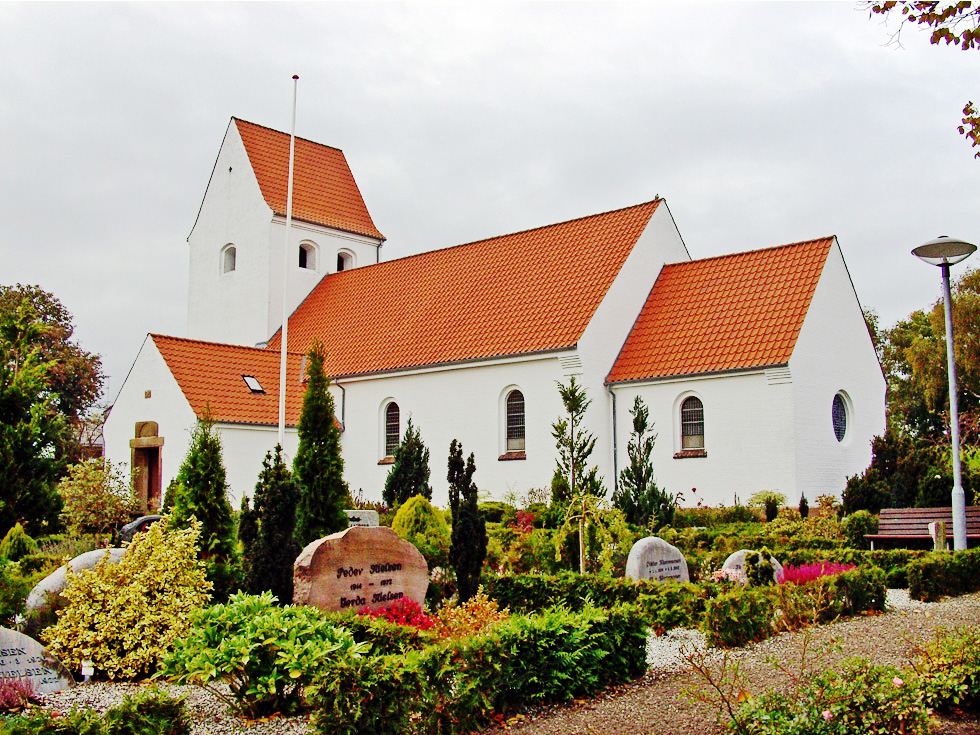
Kolind Church

Kolind Church is located in the northeastern part of the town just 300 metres east of the railway station.

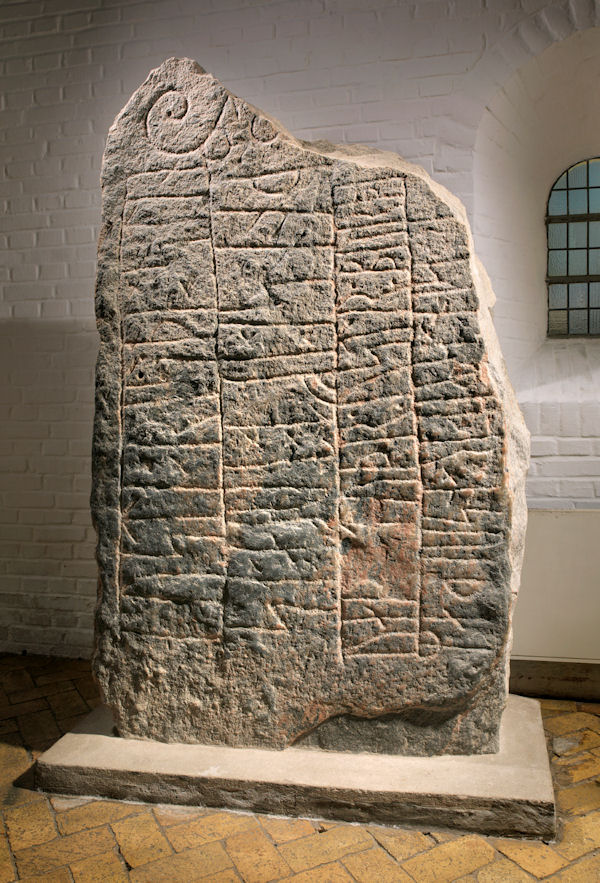
The runestone in the armory of the church

A runestone is erected at the armory of the church. It was originally located as a door threshold between the porch and the church and was notified in 1868 by state councilor Jens Jakob Worsåe - and at his behest placed in the armory.

== Transportation ==
Kolind is served by Kolind railway station on the Grenaa Line between Aarhus and Grenaa.
