= Michelle Brandstrup =

Danish handball player (born 1987)

Personal information
- Full name: Michelle Brandstrup
- Nationality: Danish
- Born: 24 September 1987 (age 39) Mårslet, Denmark

Sport
- Sport: Handball
- Position: Right Back
- Current club: Ringkøbing Håndbold
- Number: 10

Youth career
- Years: Team
- –: TMG Mårslet
- –: Odder IGF

Senior clubs
- Years: Team
- –: Brabrand IF
- 2009-2013: Våg Vipers (Norway)
- 2013-2014: Vejen EH
- 2014-2021: Ringkøbing Håndbold
National team
Years	Team	Apps	(Gls)
2004	Denmark U19	3	(3)

Teams managed
- 2022-: Ringkøbing Håndbold (director)

Michelle Brandstrup (born 24 September 1987) is a Danish former handball player who last played for Ringkøbing Håndbold, where she is currently the sporting director.

Brandstrup started playing Handball in her hometown at TMG Mårslet, and then moved on to Odder IGF followed by Brabrand IF. This prompted a move to the Norwegian club Våg Vipers, where she broke into the first team and got an important role. She returned to Denmark to play for Vejen EH on a 3-year contract, but the club went bankrupt after her first year back in Denmark. Therefore, she had to find a new club and joined recently promoted Ringkøbing Håndbold, where she played out the rest of her career.

She did initially announce her plan to end her career in 2020, but because said season was cut short by COVID-19, she was convinced by her club Ringkøbing Håndbold to continue for one more year.

Since August 2022 she has been the director at Ringkøbing Håndbold.
