= Lyngby, Norddjurs Municipality =

Lyngby
- Village
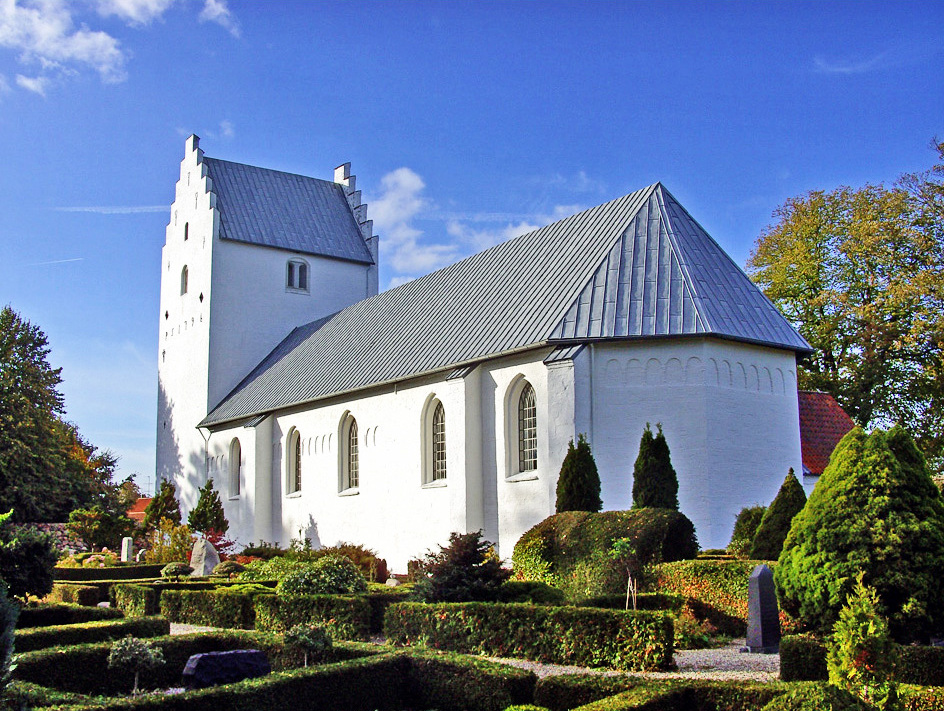
- Lyngby Church

- Location in Central Denmark Region Lyngby (Denmark)
- Coordinates: 56°22′4″N 10°44′45″E
- Country: Denmark
- Region: Central Denmark (Midtjylland)
- Municipality: Norddjurs Municipality
- Parish: Lyngby Parish

Population (2026)
  - Total: 299

Lyngby is a small village with a population of 299 (as of 1 January 2026), located in Norddjurs Municipality, Central Denmark Region in Denmark.

Lyngby Church is situated within the village.
