= Grenaa railway station =

Railway station in Norddjurs Municipality, Denmark

Grenaa
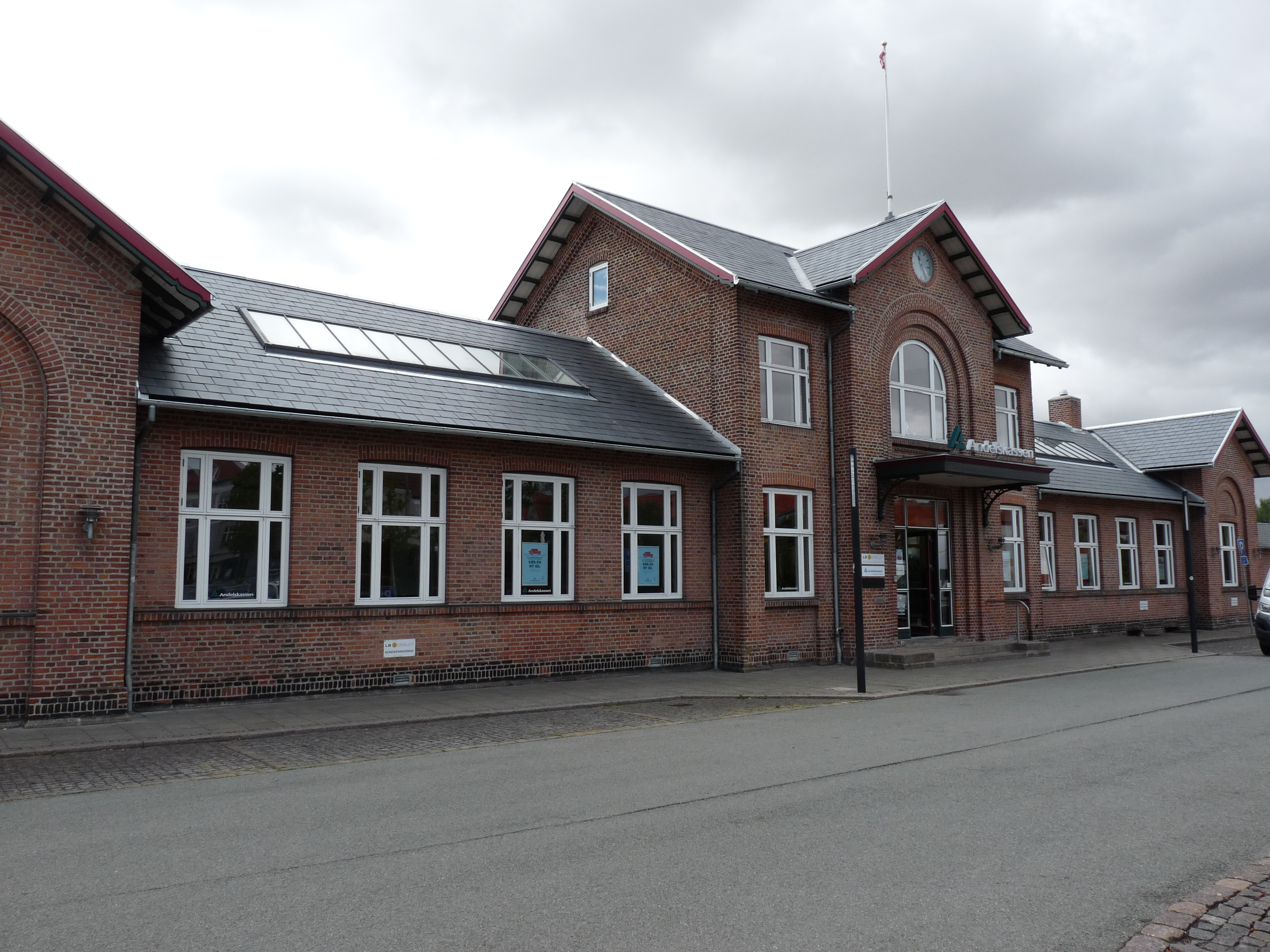
- Front facade of Grenaa station in 2018

General information
- Location: Stationsplads 4; 8500 Grenaa; Norddjurs Municipality; Denmark
- Coordinates: 56°24′45.5″N 10°52′47″E
- Elevation: 3.7 metres (12 ft)
- Owner: Banedanmark
- Operator: Aarhus Letbane
- Line: Grenaa Line
- Platforms: 2
- Tracks: 2

Construction
- Architect: Niels Peder Christian Holsøe

History
- Opened: 24 August 1876

Services
| Preceding station | Aarhus Letbane | Following station |
|---|---|---|
| Hessel towards Odder or Mårslet | Line 1 | Terminus |
Location

Grenaa station (Danish: Grenaa Banegård) is a railway station serving the town and seaport of Grenaa on the Djursland peninsula in East Jutland, Denmark.

The station is the northeastern terminus of the Grenaa railway line from Aarhus to Grenaa. The station opened in 1876 with the opening of the Randers–Ryomgaard–Grenaa Line. Since 2019, the station has been served by the Aarhus light rail system, a tram-train network combining tram lines in the city of Aarhus with operation on railway lines in the surrounding countryside.

== History ==
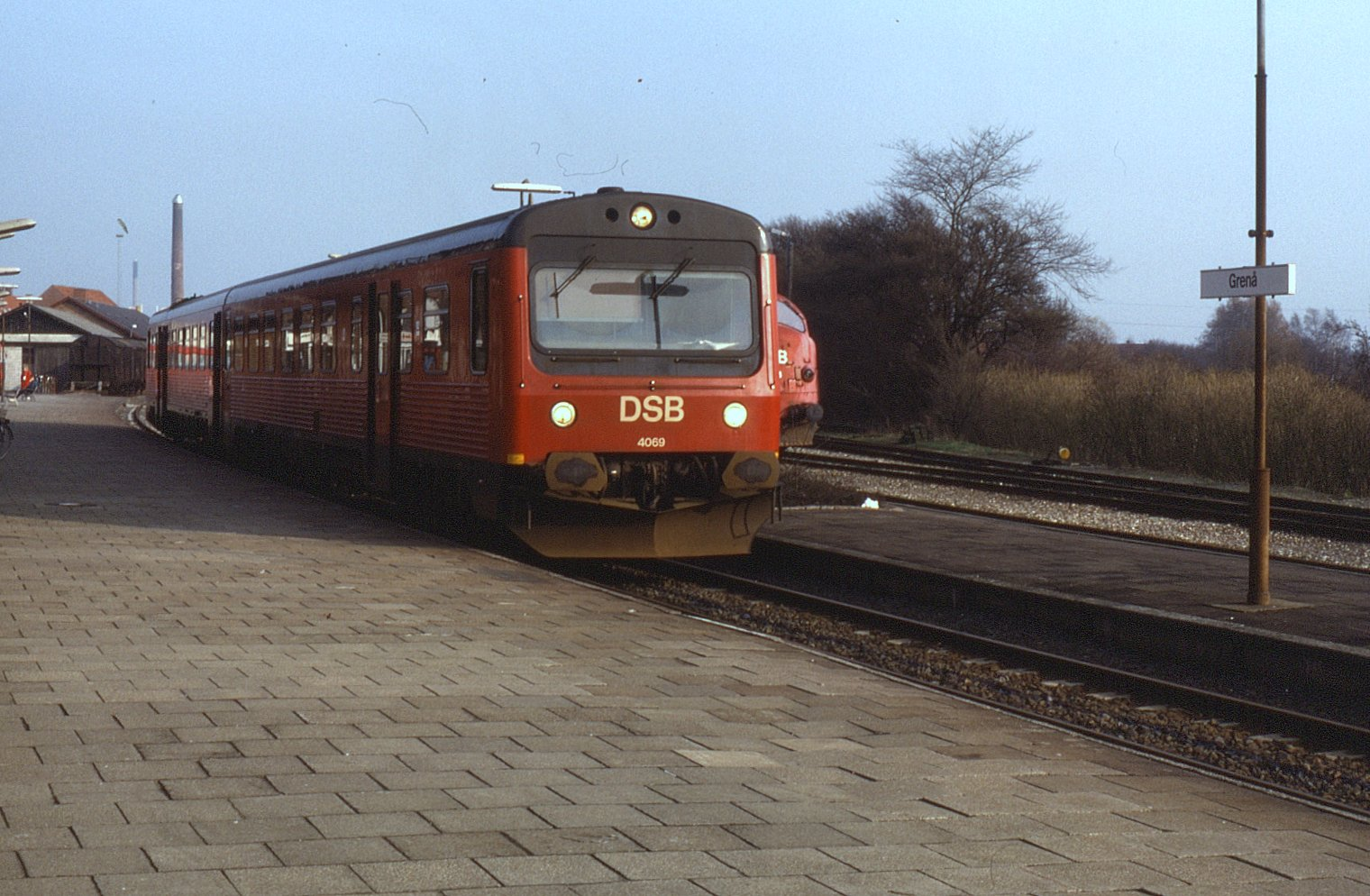
DSB MR-trainset at Grenaa station in 1990.

The station opened on 26 August 1876 as the railway company Østjyske Jernbane (ØJJ) opened the railway line Randers-Ryomgaard-Grenaa from Randers to Grenaa. In 1877, ØJJ opened a branch line from Ryomgård to Aarhus, and just a few years later the trains starting running directly between Grenaa and Aarhus, with the Ryomgård-Randers section being reduced to a branch line used mostly for rail freight transport.

From 1881 the train services were operated by the national railway company DSB which from 2012 ran frequent local train services between Grenaa, Aarhus and Odder as part of the Aarhus Commuter Rail service.

From 2016 to 2019 the station was temporarily closed along with the Grenaa railway line while it was being reconstructed and electrified to form part of the Aarhus light rail system, a tram-train network combining tram lines in the city of Aarhus with operation on railway lines in the surrounding countryside. Since 2019, the station has been served by Line L1 of the Aarhus light rail network, operated by the multinational transportation company Keolis.

== Architecture ==
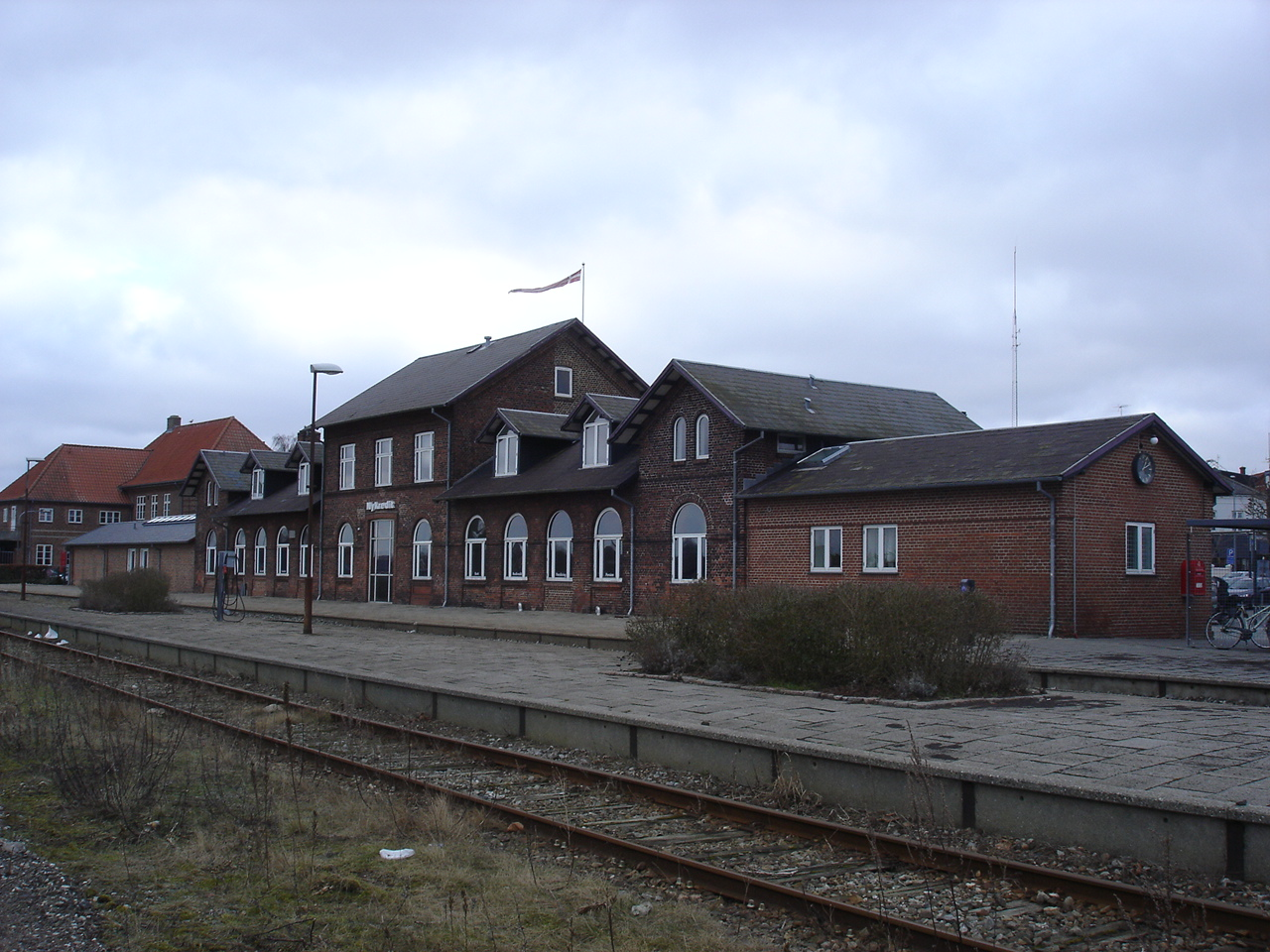
Platform facade of Grenaa station in 2013.

The station building from 1876 was designed by the Danish architect Niels Peder Christian Holsøe (1826–1895), known for the numerous railway stations he designed across Denmark in his capacity of head architect of the Danish State Railways.

== See also ==
- List of railway stations in Denmark
