= Grenaa Line =

Railway line in Denmark

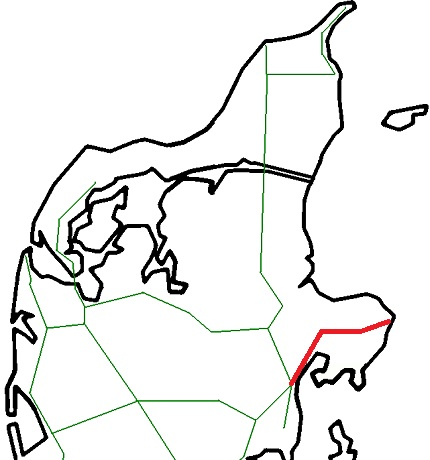

Overview
- Native name: Grenaabanen
- Owner: Banedanmark
- Termini: Grenaa station; Aarhus Central Station
- Stations: 16

Service
- Type: Railway
- System: Aarhus Light Rail
- Operator(s): Aarhus Light Rail

History
- Opened: Ryomgård-Grenaa 26 August 1876; Aarhus-Ryomgård 1 December 1877

Technical
- Line length: 68.9 kilometres (42.8 mi)
- Number of tracks: Single
- Character: Local railway
- Track gauge: 1,435 mm (4 ft 8 1/2 in)
- Electrification: None
- Operating speed: Aarhus-Ryomgård 100 km/h Ryomgård-Grenaa 75 km/h
Route map

The Grenaa Line (Danish: Grenaabanen) is a 68.9 km (42.8 mi) long standard gauge single track railway line in Denmark which runs between Aarhus and Grenaa through the peninsula of Djursland. The railway opened in 1876–1877 and was served by Danish State Railways (DSB) for many years. It is owned and maintained by Rail Net Denmark and served with passenger trains by the Aarhus Light Rail since 2019.

== History ==
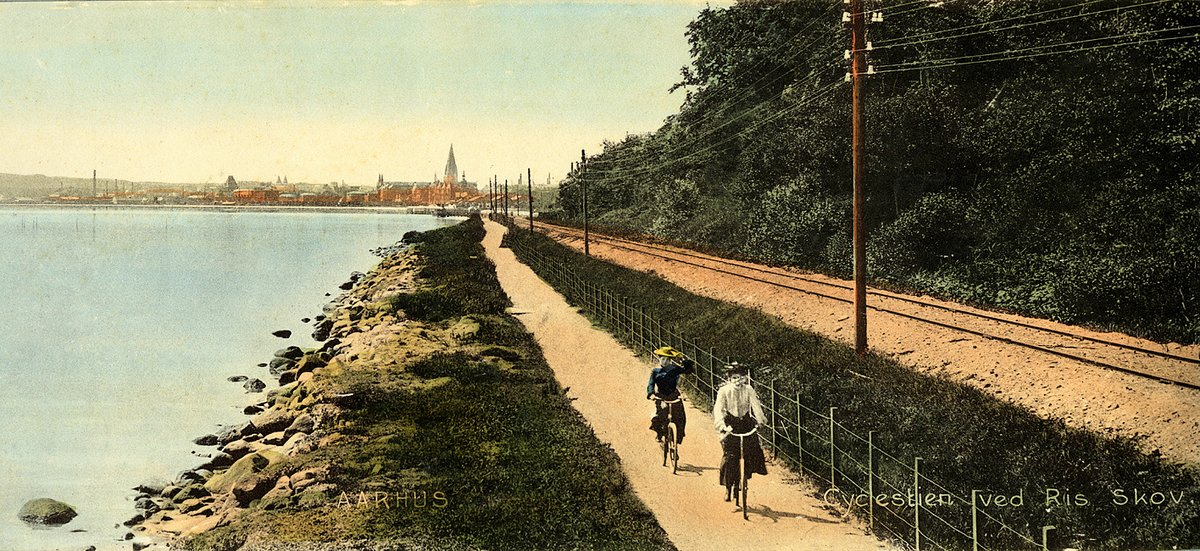
The Grenaa Line at Risskov north of Aarhus in 1904.

The section from Ryomgård to Grenaa was opened in 1876 together with the Randers-Ryomgaard Line. The section from Aarhus to Ryomgaard was opened in 1877. The two railways were operated by the joint operating company Østjyske Jernbane (ØJJ). Both lines were taken over by the Danish State Railways in 1885. Passenger traffic on the Randers-Ryomgaard Line ceased in 1971.

The Grenaa Line was around 2006 upgraded to support higher speeds. In 2012, eight new Siemens Desiro diesel trains started operation here and on the Odder Line, under the brand name Aarhus Commuter Rail (Danish: Aarhus Nærbane), carrying 1 million passengers annually.

The line was closed during electrification with overhead lines, and reopened in 2019 as Aarhus Light Rail.

== Stations ==
- Grenaa station
- Trustrup station
- Kolind station
- Ryomgård station
- Mørke station
- Hornslet station
- Løgten station
- Skødstrup station
- Hjortshøj station
- Hovmarken railway halt
- Lystrup station
- Torsøvej station
- Vestre Strandallé railway halt
- Østbanetorvet station
- Skolebakken railway halt
- Aarhus Central Station

=== Previous stations ===
- Ålsø railway halt
- Homå railway halt
- Hallendrup railway halt
- Koed railway halt
- Thorsager station
- Risskov station
- Den Permanente railway halt
- Europaplads railway halt

== Future propositions ==
The line is currently being adapted for the Aarhus Light Rail (Danish: Aarhus Letbane), an electric tram-train service scheduled for opening in 2017, but the Grenaa Line in 2018.
