= Ryomgård =

- Town
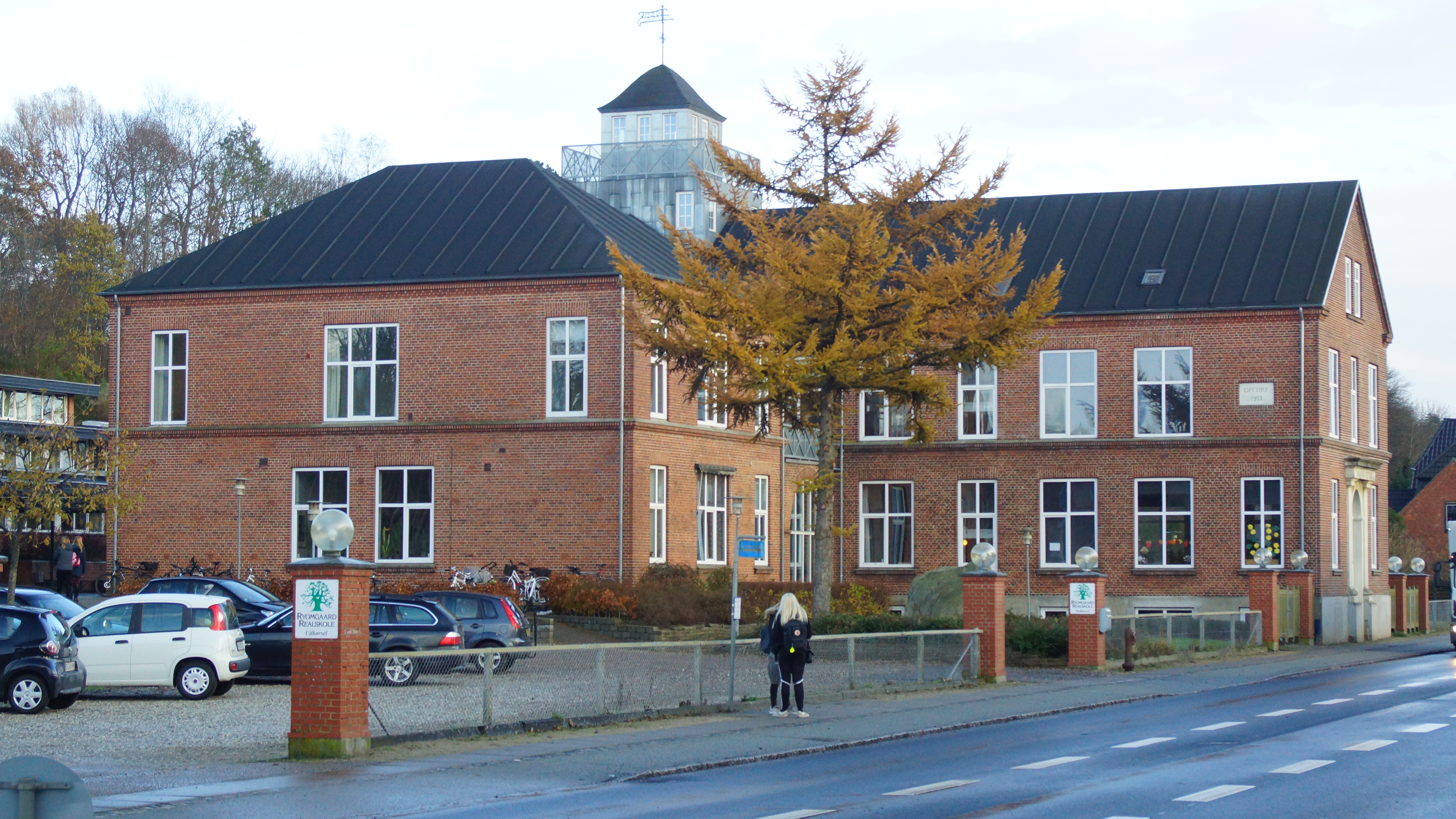
- Ryomgård Realskole, School from 1913

- Ryomgård in Denmark on the peninsula, Djursland Ryomgård (Central Denmark Region)
- Coordinates: 56°23′N 10°30′E
- Country: Denmark
- Region: Central Denmark (Østjylland)
- Municipality: Syddjurs

Area
  - Urban: 2.1 km^{2} (0.81 sq mi)

Population (2026)
  - Urban: 2,779
  - Urban density: 1,300/km^{2} (3,400/sq mi)
- Time zone: UTC+1 (CET)
  - Summer (DST): UTC+2 (CEST)
- Postal code: 8550
- Website: www.ryomgaard.dk

Ryomgård is a Danish country town with a population of 2,779 (1 January 2026) located 29 kilometers north east of the country’s second largest city Aarhus. As such Ryomgård is in part a pendler town to Aarhus.

Ryomgård lies in the middle of the peninsula, Djursland, protruding into the Kattegat Sea from another peninsula, Jutland, that extends up from northern Germany. It’s a 216 kilometer drive to the German border. From Ryomgård it’s a two and a half hour drive by car and ferry to the Danish capital Copenhagen on the island of Zealand.

Ryomgård is located in Syddjurs Municipality which covers the southern half of the Djursland-peninsula. Ryomgård lies 14 kilometers from the sea.

== History ==
Before roads were common in Denmark prior to 1700 the place where Ryomgård lies was one of the few passageways over the swamp and lake divide that separated the northern part of Djursland from the southern part. There was a toll station for passage, close to the manor house, Gammel Ryomgård, that dates back to the 17th century.

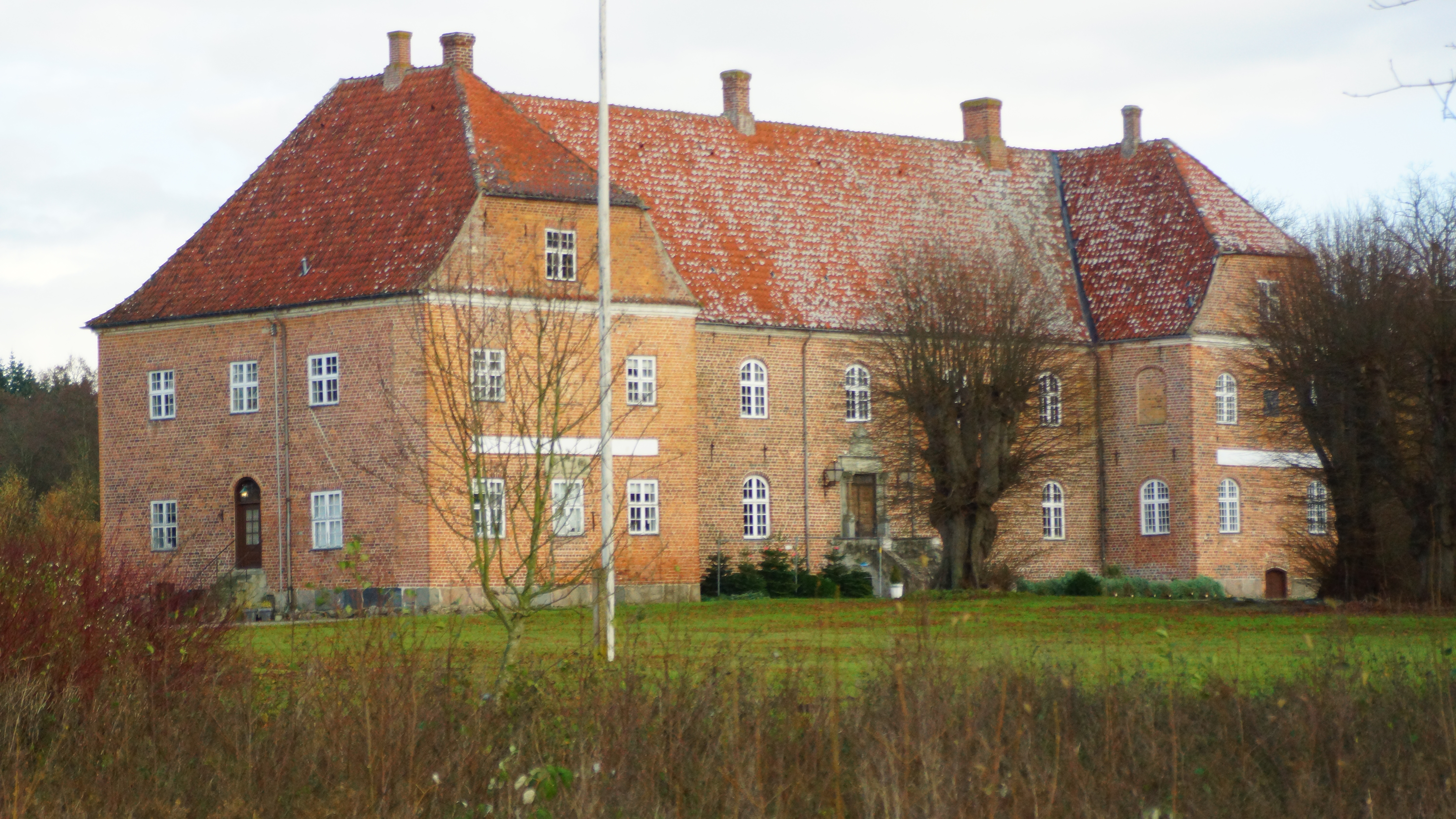
With the arrival of the railway Ryomgård became a town in the late 1870s, built close to the manor house Gammel Ryomgård.

Ryomgård came to life as a town in the late 1870s when a railway was established from Randers on mainland Jutland across the Djursland peninsula to the fishing- and seaport Grenå on the east coast of Djursland.

Ryomgård lay midway between Randers and Grenå by the railway. The development of Ryomgård was further consolidated when another rail line was built between Ryomgård and Århus, Denmark's second largest city 30 kilometers south east of Ryomgård. This was also in the 1870s.

Around 1900 Ryomgård was described as follows: "Ryom railway town with cooperative dairy, brickworks, grocery store, mill, guesthouse, railway, telegraph and poststation."

In 1911 another railway line from Ryomgård to Gjerrild in the north of Djursland was added, making Ryomgård a railway hub on Djursland.

Establishing a lower secondary school, Ryomgård Realskole, near the railway in 1913 contributed further to the growth of the town.

== Geography and Climate ==
The climate in the region is temperate coastal, with an average summer temperature in July of 20 degrees Celsius in the day, and 12 degrees at night, and an average winter temperature in January with 5 degrees in the day and 1 degree at night (1961 – 1990) The average precipitation is 722 millimeters per year, making Ryomgård as well as the rest of Denmark well suited for farming. Barley, wheat, canola, and in recent years corn, are common crops in the farmland surrounding Ryomgård.

The name "Ryomgård" comes from the Danish word Ryom, which is one of several old words for clearing in a wood. Also today the town is close to a central forested area on Djursland, the Fjeld and Løvenholm woods.

Ryomgårds main street, Vestergade, is 17 meters above sea level. The town was founded above the north bank of a former sound that in the stone ages cut of north Djursland from the mainland making the northern part of Djursland an island. Newer parts of the town have been built on south facing hills up from to the former sound reaching an elevation above sea level of about 40 meters. At the top of the hills, where the land gets more flat, evened out by of ice sheets during the last ice age, 12.000 years ago, the most recent new housing is seen.

== Demographics ==
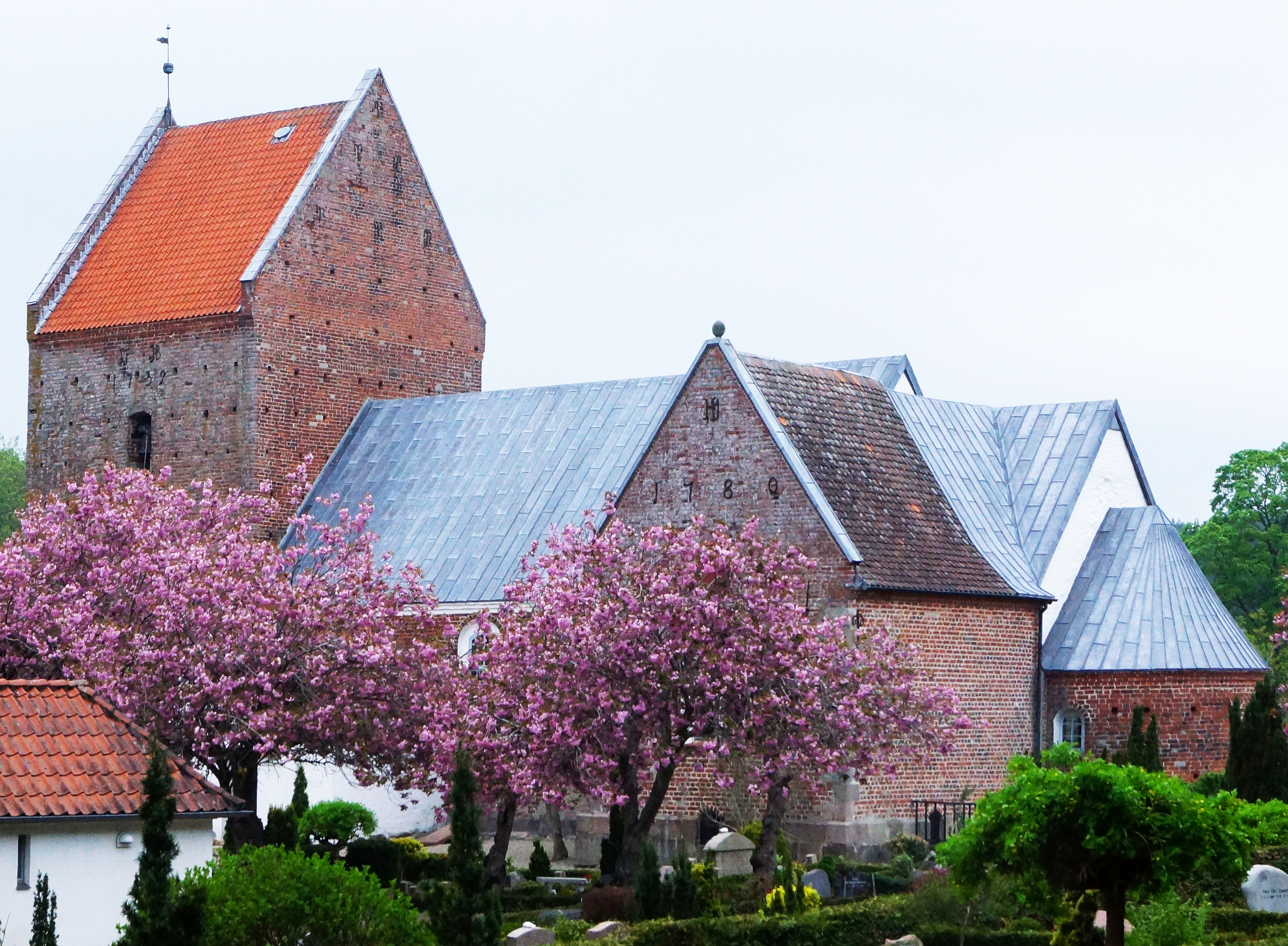
Ryomgårds church in Marie Magdalene

The geographical region, Djursland, where Ryomgård is situated, has an average population density of 42 inhabitants per square km, as compared to 407 for neighboring England and 230 for neighboring Germany. Although this is much more than in the other Scandinavian countries Norway, Sweden and Finland with extensive mountain ranges and a colder climate, it rarely gets crowded in the Djursland area, including along the 260 kilometer coastline of Djursland, where public access to all of the coastline is secured according to Danish law.

This contributes to a potential for coastal tourism in the region. There is a summer influx of tourists, mainly from the Scandinavian countries plus Germany and Holland. Often based on staying in summer rentals along the coast. Even though this is part of the overall economy of the Djursland area, Ryomgård is not significantly based on tourism, due to the relative inland location away from the coast.

Many Danes have a working knowledge of English and to some extent German - the two main foreign languages taught in Danish schools.

Traditionally Danes are Protestants with about 75 percent being members of the Protestant church, Folkekirken. In the Danish Wikipedia article about “Danskere” The Danes, it is stated that about 40 percent of Danes are non-believers, according to a survey. It is characteristic that only a minority of Danish Protestants are regular church goers.

== Institutions ==
There are a number of indoor and outdoor public sports facilities in Ryomgård.

Public institutions in Ryomgård cover aspects such as elderly care, protected housing, kindergartens, maintenance of public infrastructure and more.

By the railway station in Ryomgård Djurslands Railway Museum is located describing Danish and local railway history over the last 150 years.

== Transport ==
The Grenaa railway line between Aarhus and Grenaa passes through Ryomgård. After an electrification and renovation from 2016 to 2019, the railway reopened in 2019 with train connections from Ryomgård railway station to Aarhus and Grenaa every 30 minutes as opposed to 60 minutes before the renovation.

By car it takes about 25 minutes to reach the northern outskirts of Aarhus, driving on the Djursland Motorway two thirds of the way.

Aarhus Airport is 14 kilometers from Ryomgård, with several national flights daily to Copenhagen, as well as a number of international flights, including a Ryan Air connection to Stansted in England.

From the bus station in Ryomgård there are connections to neighboring towns including Randers, Hornslet, Rønde, Ebeltoft, Grenaa and Bønnerup as well as Aarhus.

== Education ==
There is a public and a private primary school in Ryomgård. The private school, Ryomgård Realskole, on the main street, was founded in 1913 and has about 270 pupils in grades 1 to 10. The public School, Marienhofskolen, located at the top of one of the hills down to the main street, was founded in 1971, and has 400 pupils in grades 1 to 9.

Ryomgård has also got a Produktionsskole, a practically oriented school for young people who are on their way to finding an education or job.

The three towns, Rønde, 12 kilometers from Ryomgård, Randers, 34 kilometers from Ryomgård, and Grenaa 28 kilometers from Ryomgård, have high schools and vocational educations used by young people in Ryomgård, who can go to and from these towns by bus.

Young people in Ryomgård also go by bus or train to Aarhus to attend high school and other educations, as well as University.

== Housing ==
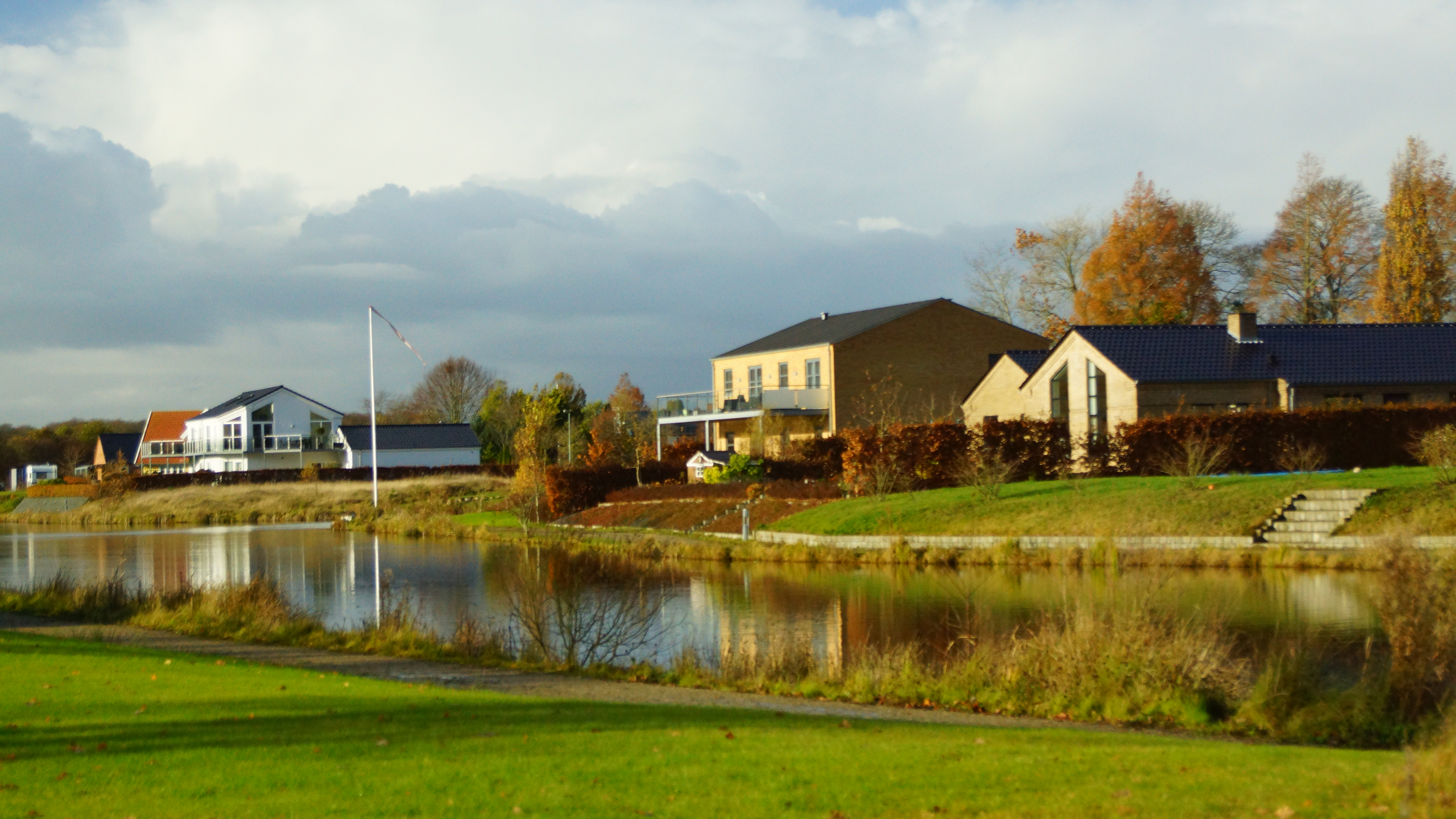
Housing style in Ryomgård circa 2015

The sixties and the seventies saw economic growth in Denmark, and a lot of single family homes with a characteristic one story design were built. This is also the case in Ryomgård, where the hills up from the main street became built up. The public school Marienhofskolen was also built in this period at the top of one of the hills.

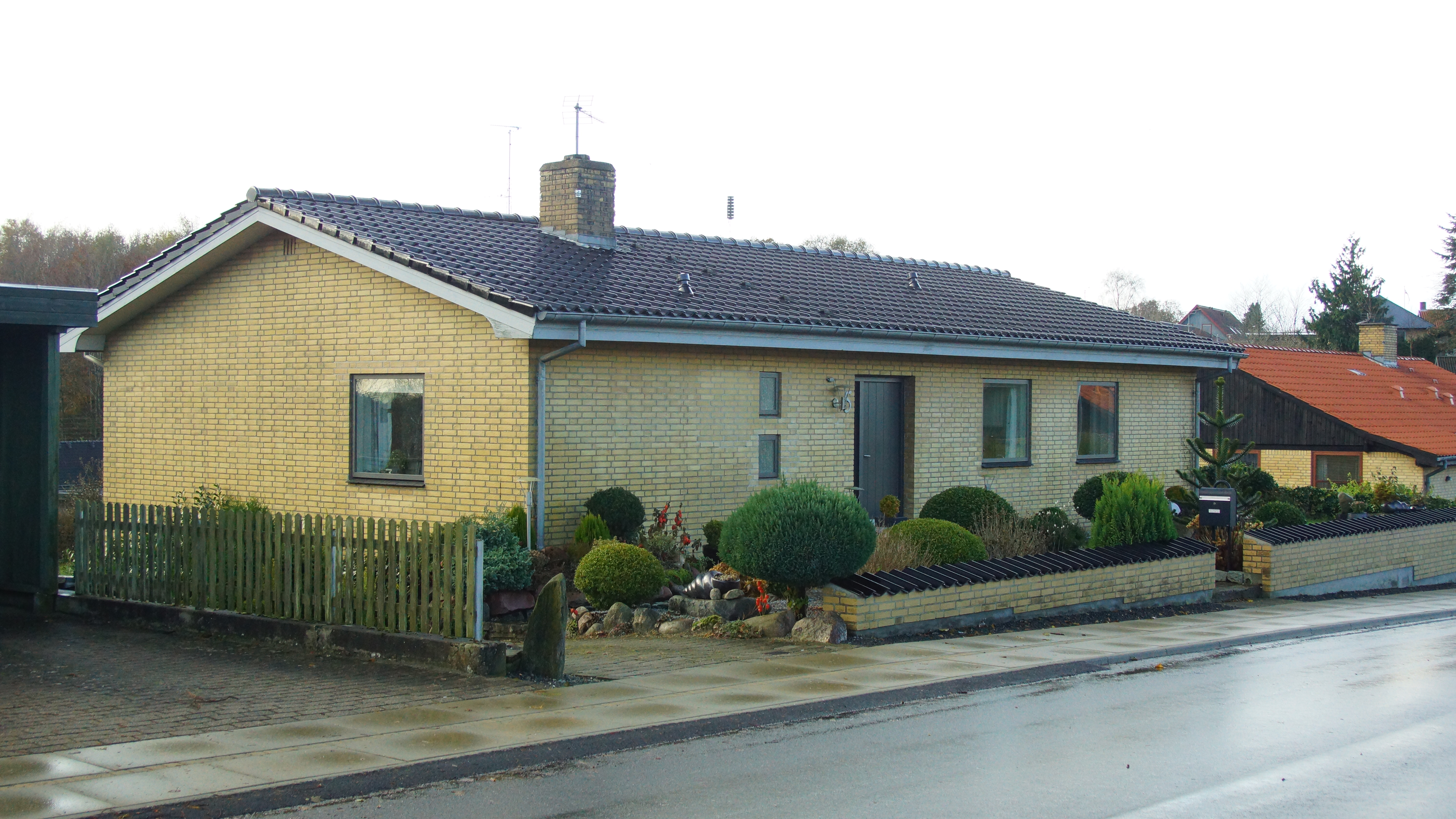
Typical housing style from the prosperous sixties and seventies as seen in Ryomgård

Today a typical 130 square meter house with a 1500 square meter garden from the sixties or seventies that is well kept is priced in the range of 1.2 – 2 million kroner. Such houses are within the price range of working or middle-class families where both adults work. (Both adults working full-time in a family is the norm in Denmark). Newly built houses typically cost between 2 – 3 million kroner in Ryomgård, according to a local real estate agent.

Along the main street in Ryomgård, houses built between the twenties and fifties can be seen.

== Surroundings ==
Ryomgårds neighboring town 6 kilometers to the east, Pindstrup, has been a centre for peat moss production employing many people in the first half of the 19th century at Pindstrup Mosebrug. Now only the Pindstrup Mosebrug head quarteres are located in Pindstrup, with production facilities based on peat bogs located elsewhere in and outside Denmark. At the same Pindstrup-location a spinoff, Novopan, is a European manufacturer of particleboard for house building and furniture production based on 80 percent recycled wood.

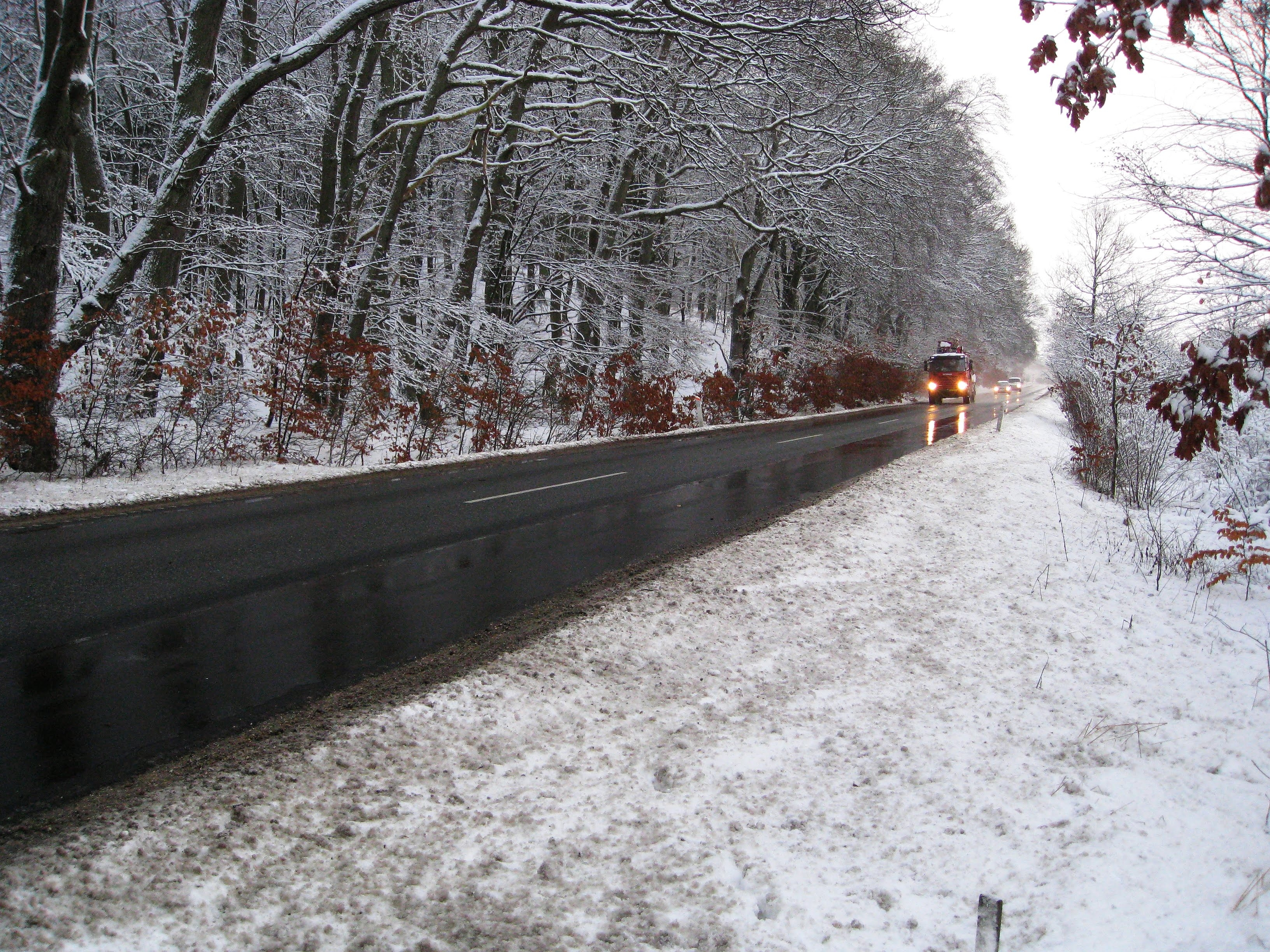
The road between Ryomgård and neighboring town Pindstrup going through the wood, Fjeld Skov.

8 kilometers east of Ryomgård lies Kolind, a similar seized town that has given name to the Sound of Kolind – now a drained lake, that is rich farmland below sea level. The former lake stretches out to the Kattegat sea by the seaport, Grenå 30 kilometers from Ryomgård to the east. The lowland meadows south of Ryomgård become The Sound of Kolind to the east by Kolind.

Ryomgård is 3 kilometers from Fjeld Skov, a forest connected to Løvenholm Skov. This forested area is one of the larger woods in Denmark. Common tree types in this climatic region are Norwegian spruce, Scotch pine, larch, beach oak, and birch.

The forest lake, Valum Sø, just east of Ryomgård has a recreational footpath round it often used by joggers from Ryomgård.

Being located on a peninsula there are 20 sandy beaches and several marinas within a 15 - 30 kilometers driving distance from Ryomgård.

Denmarks largest river, Gudenå, has its outlet into the 30 kilometer long Randers Fjord, a 28 kilometer drive north of Ryomgård, Here recreational fishing for species such as sea trout, salmon, whitefish, flounders and herring is common.

Fishing and snorkeling is also good on the 50 kilometer east coast of the peninsula Djursland, north and south of Grenå.

== Notable people ==
- Martin Jørgensen (born 1975 in Ryomgård) a former professional footballer with 530 club caps and 102 for Denmark
- Mads Jørgensen (born 1979 in Ryomgård) a Danish former professional footballer over 200 club caps and 1 for Denmark
- Dennis Høegh (born 1989 in Ryomgård) a Danish professional footballer almost 200 club caps

== Points of interest ==
- Walks and hiking – north, east and south of Ryomgård along the coastline of Djursland with a varied and accessible 260 km coastline
- Kalø Castle - ruined castle on a peninsula with bights, inlets on southern Djursland 16 km from Ryomgård
- Mols Bjerge National Park – Hilly landscape – walks, sightseeing drives, and horseback riding, on southern Djursland 20 km south of Ryomgård
- Grenaa Beach - 5 km of sandy beach starting at Grenaa Marina. Nominated as one of 2 best Danish beaches in 2006
- Cliffs of Sangstrup and Karlby - Fossil rich coastal lime cliffs 35 km north east of Ryomgård
- Kattegatcentret – Aquarium by the Sea in Grenaa with large sharks and a focus on Nordic salt water fish. 250 species of marine creatures from around the world, including seals
- Aarhus - Denmarks second largest town, with several international attractions, such as, The Old Town, Den gamle By, 60 km from Grenaa
- Djurslands medieval country churches. Thorsager Church is the only round church in Jutland. Udby church by Randers Fjord is a picturesque navigation mark for incoming ships
- Djurs Sommerland - Amusement park. The largest attraction on Djursland with regards to number of visitors. 9 km from Ryomgård
- Rosenholm Castle - by Hornslet, plus other castles and manor houses on Djursland
- Skandinavisk Dyrepark – Zoo - Park with extensive Nordic wildlife including brown- and polar bears. 14 km from Ryomgård
- Jylland, Ebeltoft – One of the world's largest wooden warships, restoration for 15 million euros completed in 1998. 27 km from Ryomgård

== See also ==
- Djursland
- Mols
- Rønde
- Randers Fjord
- Mols Bjerge National Park
- Glatved Beach
- Danish steam frigate Jylland
- Katholm Castle
- Kalø Castle
- Grenaa Beach
- Bønnerup Strand
- Cliffs of Sangstrup
- Aarhus (Århus), Ebeltoft and Randers - nearby cities
