= Mårslet =

Town in Denmark

- Town
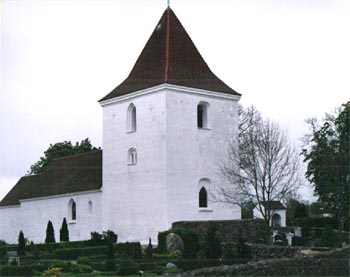
- Mårslet Church

- Location in Denmark Mårslet (Central Denmark Region)
- Coordinates: 56°04′05″N 10°09′40″E
- Country: Denmark
- Region: Midtjylland
- Municipality: Aarhus
- Foundation: pre-history (unknown)
- Railway town: 1884
- Part of Aarhus Municipality: 1970

Area
  - Urban: 2.31 km^{2} (0.89 sq mi)

Population (1. January 2026)
  - Urban: 5,176
  - Urban density: 2,240/km^{2} (5,800/sq mi)
  - Gender: 2,503 males and 2,673 females
  - Demonym: Mårsletter
- Time zone: UTC+1 (CET)
  - Summer (DST): UTC+1 (CEST)
- Postal code: 8320
- Area code: (+45) 86
- Website: www.maarslet.nu

Mårslet is a town in Aarhus Municipality, located approximately 11 km (6.8 mi) south of the city of Aarhus in the Central Denmark Region. As of 1 January 2026, it has a population of 5,176. Originally a rural village, Mårslet has developed into a commuter suburb of Aarhus, supported by a light rail connection and significant residential expansion in recent decades.

== History ==
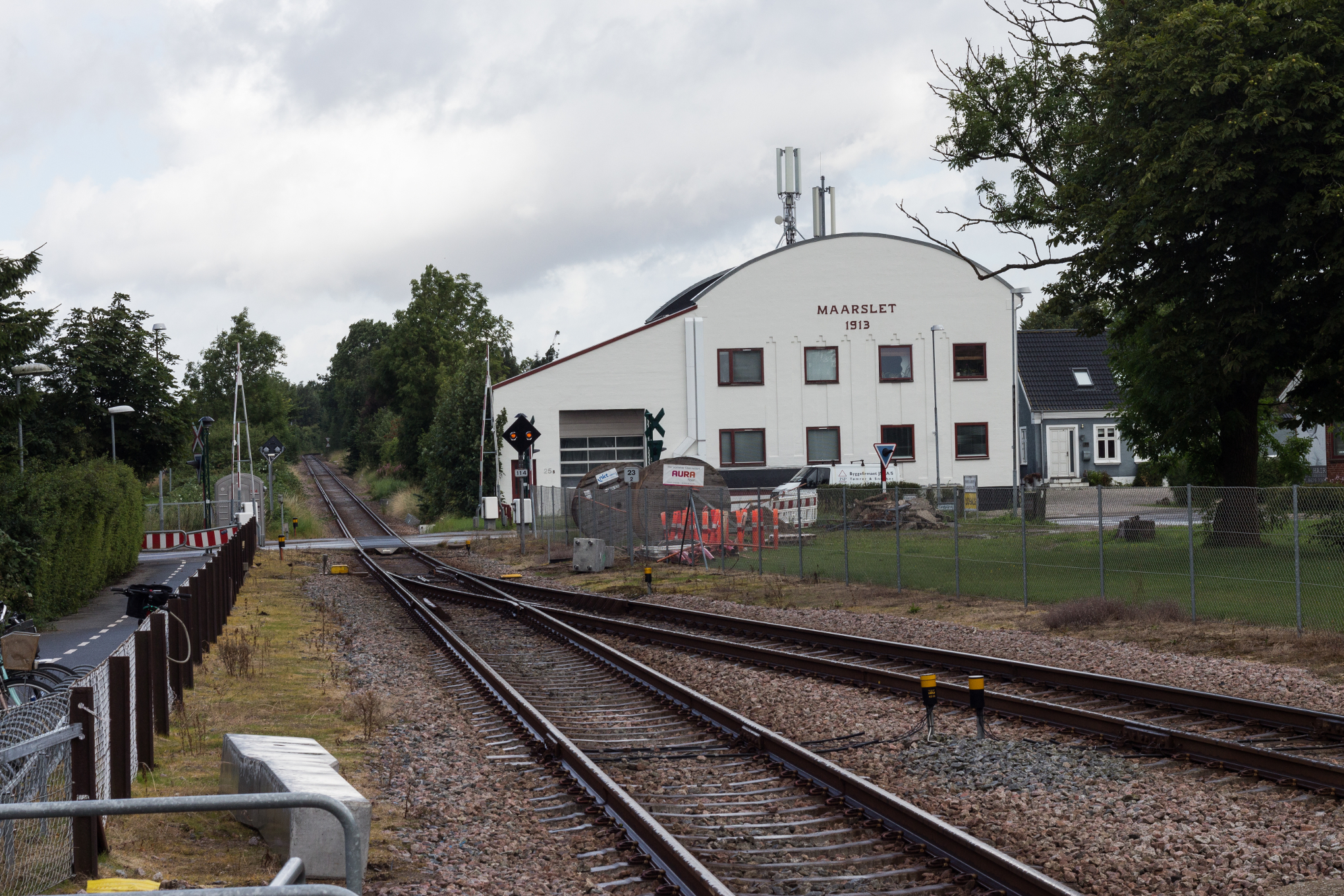
Motor Mill in Mårslet as seen from Mårslet Station.

Mårslet was first recorded in 1360 under the name Mordslet, a compound possibly derived from the Old Danish word marth (meaning either "marten" or "forest") and slet ("clearing"). The name thus likely refers to a woodland clearing.

Historically, the settlement developed as an irregular roadside village (vejforteby) in a small valley through which the Giber Å stream flows. Early farmsteads were located southeast of the church and along Lindegårdsvej to the southwest, and elements of the original street layout remain visible today.

The parish church, located on a hill north of the stream, dates from the Romanesque period and contains a well-preserved set of wall paintings from around 1200.

Significant development began in 1884 with the construction of the Hads-Ning Herreders Railway (later the Odder Line), which included a station in Mårslet. The improved connectivity spurred residential expansion, particularly around 1900, when red-brick houses with decorative masonry were built along Tandervej and nearby streets.

Mårslet functioned as an independent parish municipality until the 1970 Danish Municipal Reform, when it was merged into Aarhus Municipality. From the 1960s onward, the town experienced substantial suburban growth, with the development of large single-family housing estates.

In 2018, the Odder Line was incorporated into the Aarhus Letbane light rail system, improving public transport links to central Aarhus.

== Demographics and housing ==
Mårslet has one of the highest average household incomes in the East Jutland metropolitan area. The population has grown considerably in recent decades, driven by migration from Aarhus and a high level of new housing construction. The town includes a variety of housing types, primarily detached single-family homes.

== Transport ==
Mårslet is served by the Aarhus Letbane light rail system, which provides a travel time of approximately 25 minutes to Aarhus city centre. Bus 16, operated by Busselskabet Aarhus Sporveje, offers an alternative route with a travel time of around 30 minutes. Increased commuter traffic has led to congestion issues in the town centre during peak hours.

== Culture and sport ==
Mårslet Fællesråd (Mårslet Joint Council) is an umbrella organisation for local associations and acts as a liaison between residents and Aarhus Municipality. The council maintains the town website and contributes to the local monthly magazine, Mårslet-Bladet, which is produced on a volunteer basis.

Mårslet's main sports club is TMG (Testrup Mårslet Gymnastikforening), which offers activities in football, handball, gymnastics, basketball, volleyball, badminton, tennis, darts, pétanque, and fitness training. The club's senior football team achieved notable success in 2007 by winning the JBU Cup as the lowest-ranked team in the tournament's history, and in 2016 earned promotion to the seventh tier of Danish football. Founded in 1868, the club is Denmark’s second-oldest still active sports association, surpassed only by the rowing club Kvik in Copenhagen, which was established two years earlier.

== Notable people ==
- Claes Antonsen (born 1963), drummer
- Mads Larsen (born 1973), super middleweight boxer
- Michelle Brandstrup (born 1987), handball player

Preceding station	Aarhus Letbane	Following station
Vilhelmsborg towards Odder	Line 2	Mølleparken towards Lisbjergskolen or Lystrup
