= Tram-train =

Tramway routes which share track with main-line railways

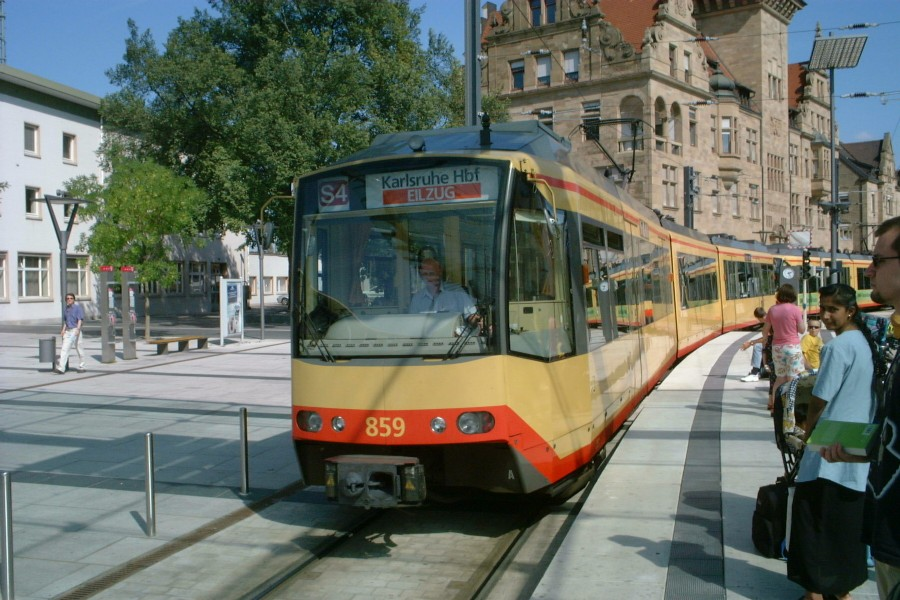
Stadtbahn street running, in Heilbronn

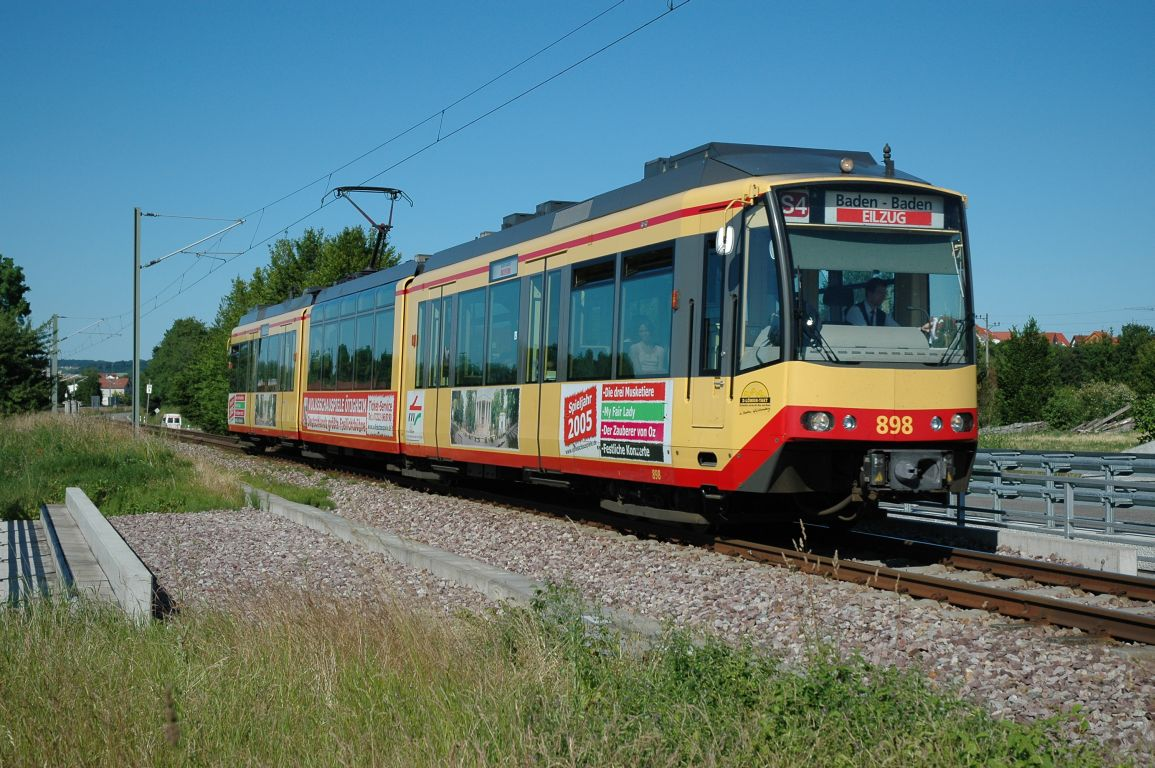
Stadtbahn on main-line railway

A tram-train, also known as a dual-system tram, is an interoperable urban rail transit system in which specially designed vehicles operate as trams on urban street-level networks and as trains on mainline railway tracks, alongside mainline trains.

By complying with both light rail and heavy rail technical and safety standards, these vehicles can use existing tram infrastructure as well as railway lines and stations, enabling a single service to operate across both networks. A tram-train combines the urban accessibility of a tram or light rail with a mainline train's greater speed in the suburbs.

The modern tram-train concept was pioneered by the German city of Karlsruhe in the late 1980s, resulting in the creation of the Karlsruhe Stadtbahn. This concept is often referred to as the Karlsruhe model, and it has since been adopted in other cities such as Mulhouse in France and in Kassel, Nordhausen and Saarbrücken in Germany. It can be regarded as an evolution of the earlier interurban operations model.

An inversion of the concept is a train-tram – a mainline train adapted to run on-street in an urban tramway, also known as the Zwickau Model.

== Technology ==
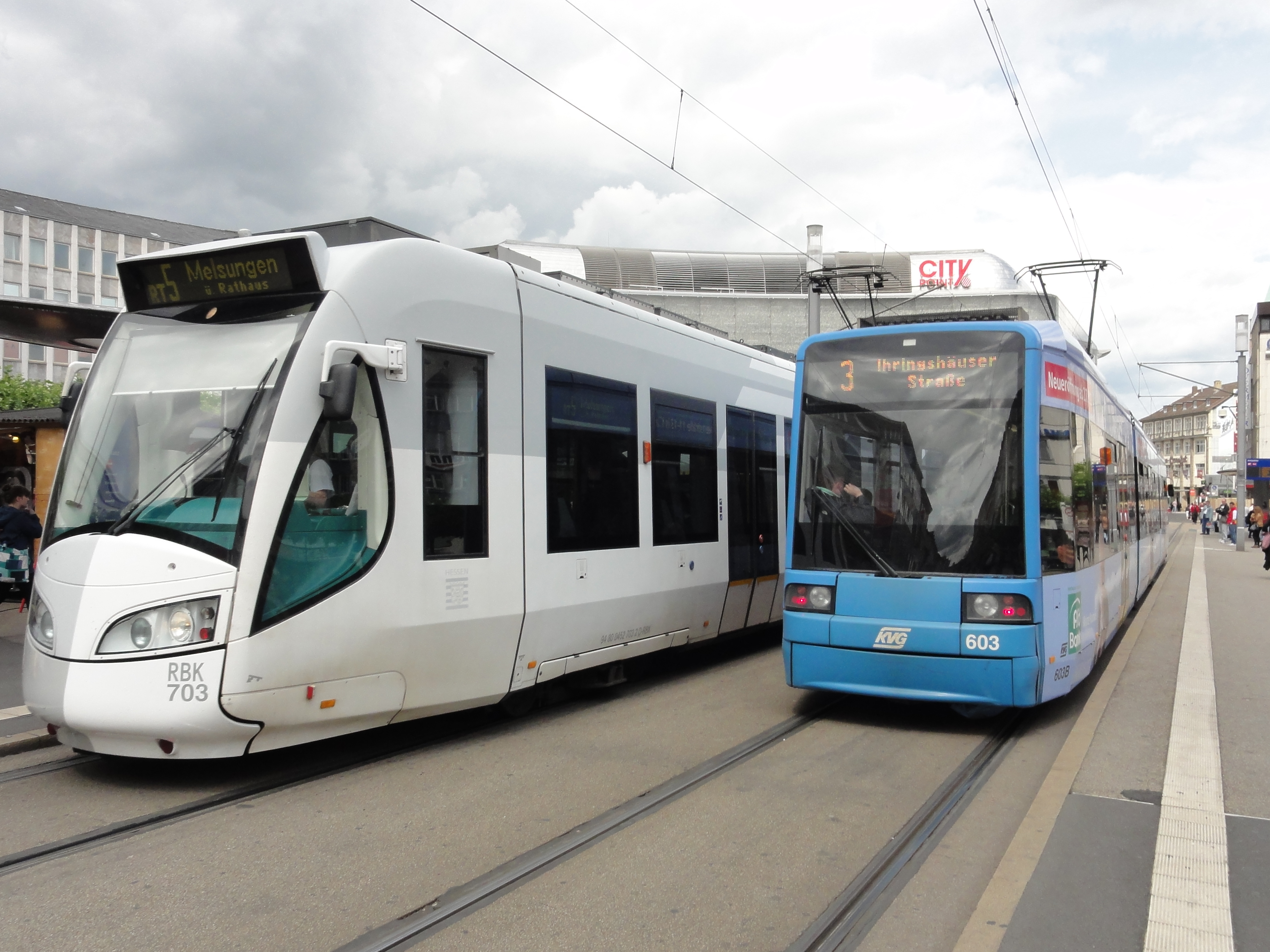
Kassel RegioTram dual voltage DC/AC Alstom RegioCitadis next to a KVG Bombardier Flexity Classic tram at Königsplatz

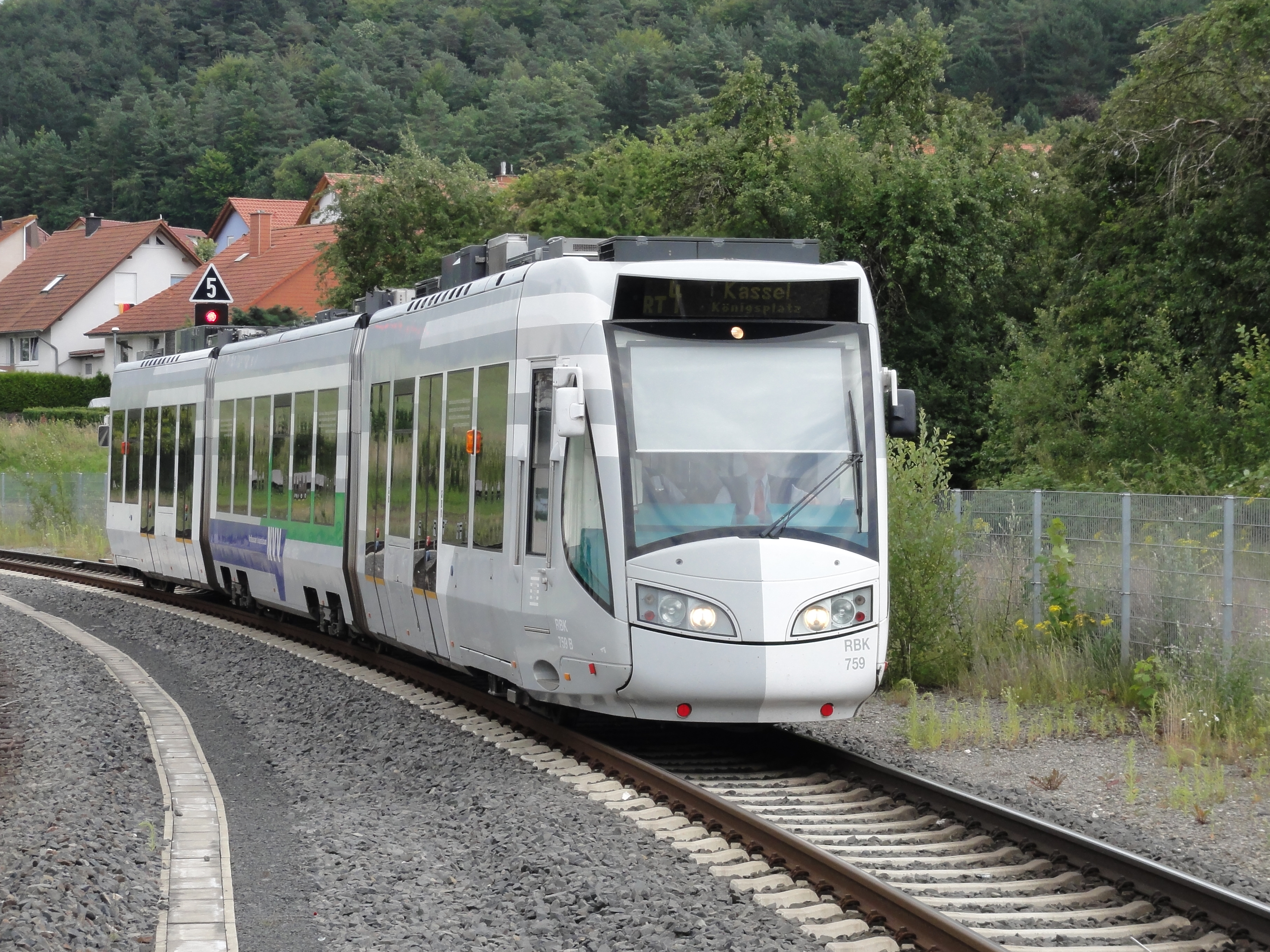
Kassel RegioTram dual mode diesel/electric Alstom RegioCitadis approaching Wolfhagen using diesel power, on main-line railway

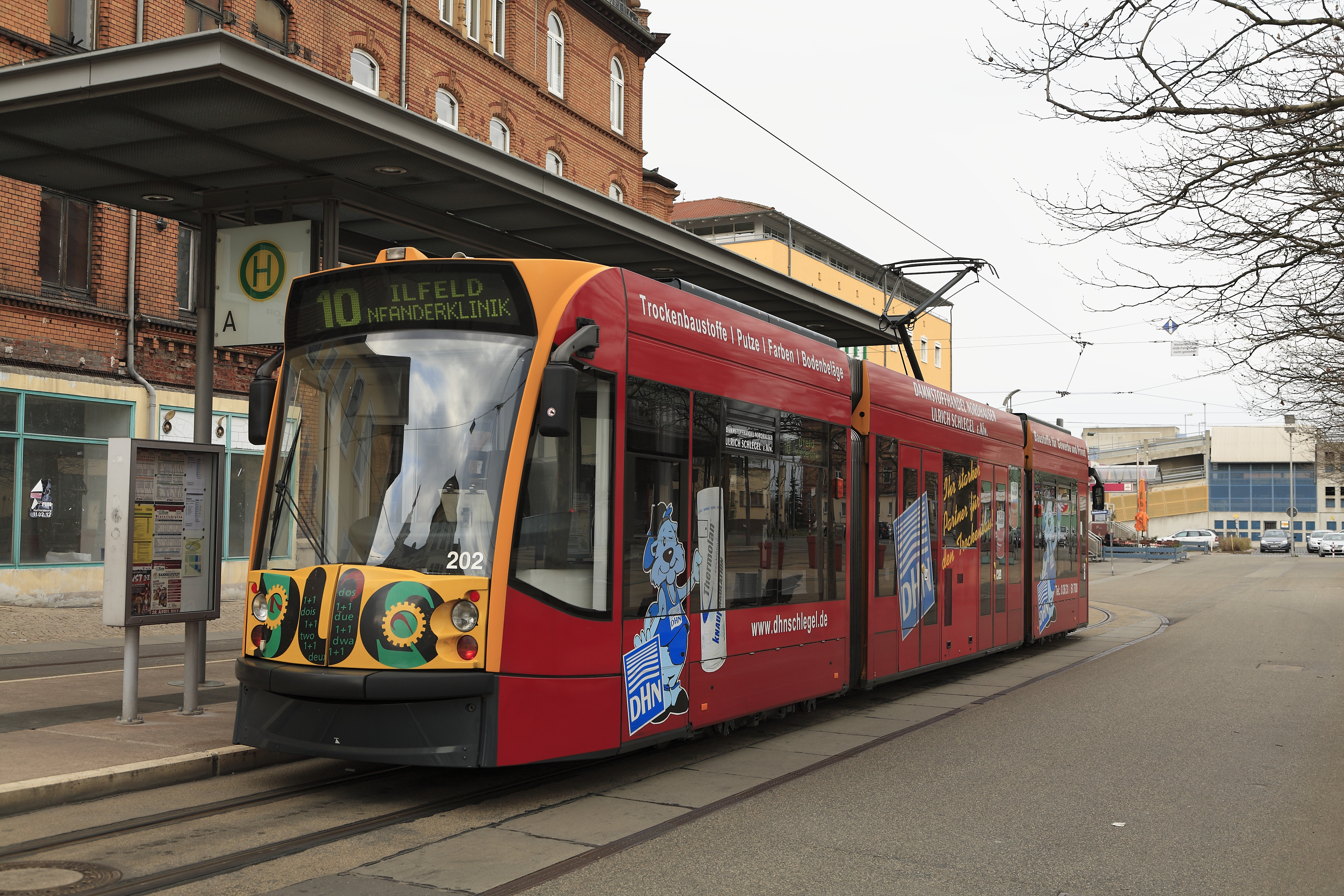
A "DUO" Combino on the Nordhausen urban tramway, where it is electrically powered via overhead wires

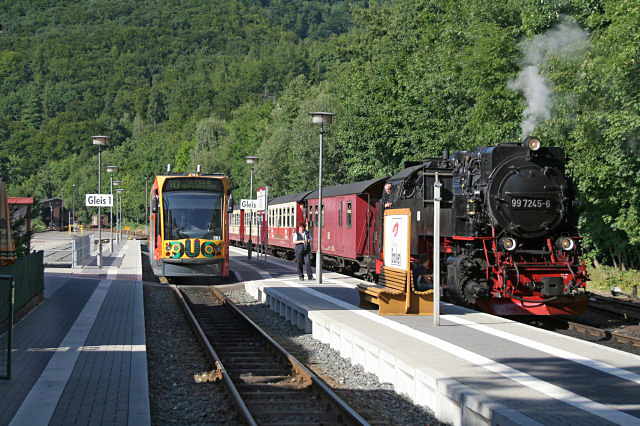
A "DUO" Combino at Ilfeld station on the HSB rural railway, where it is powered by an onboard diesel engine

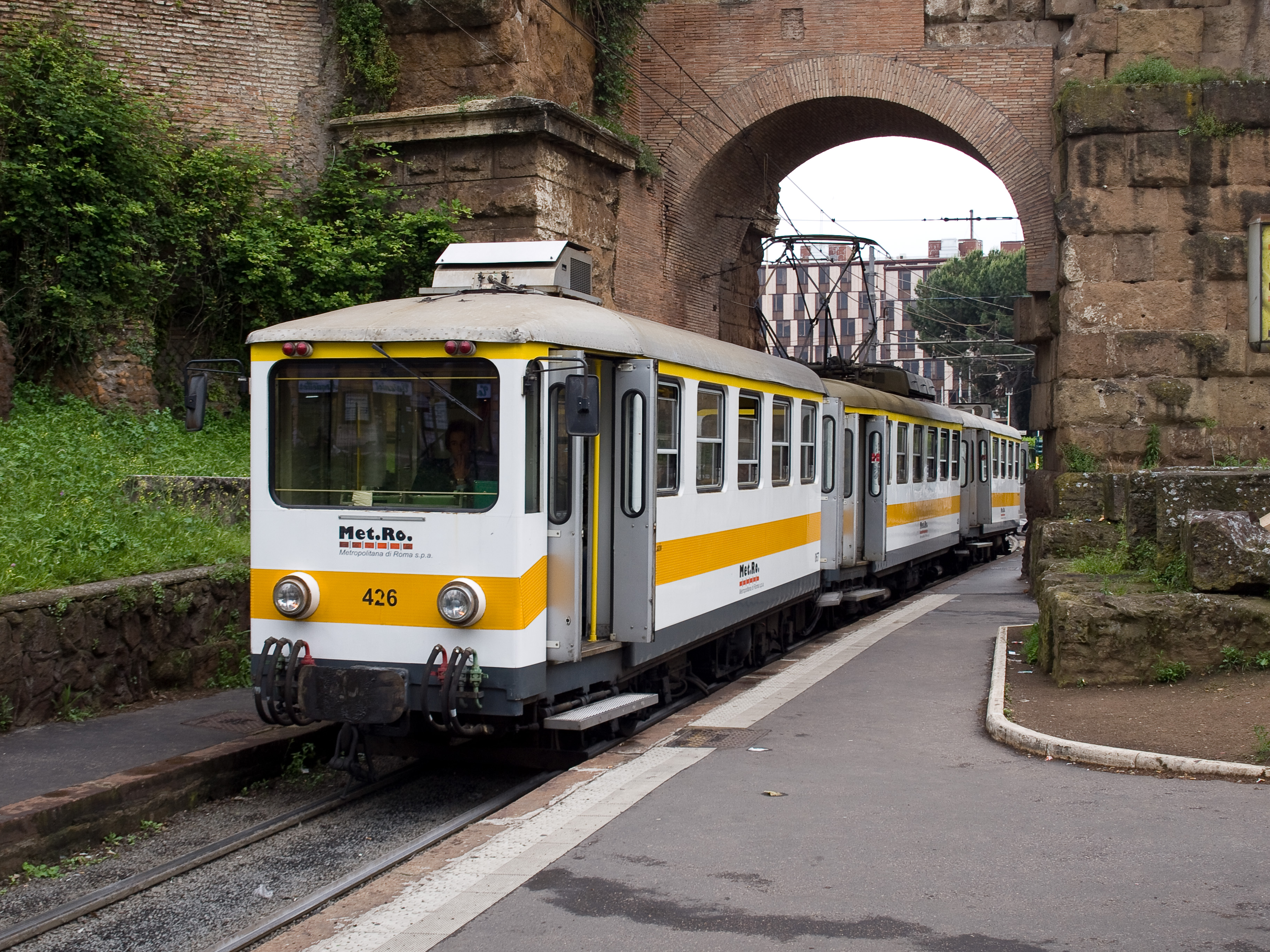
A tram-train in Rome, Italy

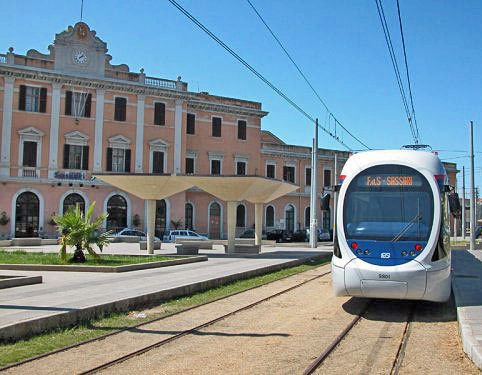
A tram-train in Sassari, Italy

The tram-train often is a type of interurban — that is, they link separate towns or cities, according to George W. Hilton and John F. Due's definition.

Most tram-trains are standard gauge, which facilitates sharing track with main-line trains. Exceptions include Alicante Tram and Nordhausen, which are metre gauge.

Tram-train vehicles are dual-equipped to suit the needs of both tram and train operating modes, with support for multiple electrification voltages if required and safety equipment such as train stops and other railway signalling equipment. The Karlsruhe and Saarbrücken systems use "PZB" or "Indusi" automatic train protection, so that if the driver passes a signal at a stop the emergency brakes are applied.

== History ==
The idea is not new; in the early 20th century, interurban streetcar lines often operated on dedicated rights-of-way between towns, while running on street trackage in town. The difference between modern tram-trains and the older interurban and radial railways is that tram-trains are built to meet mainline railway standards, rather than ignoring them. A few interurban services did share tracks with mainline steam railroads, such as the Daisy Line or East Bay Electric Lines.

In 1924, in Hobart, Australia, sharing of tracks between trams and trains was proposed.

== List of tram-train systems ==
=== Asia ===
Country	Location	System	Year opened	Lines	Stations	Length	Notes
Japan	Fukui	Fukui Fukubu Line	1924	1	23	21.4 km (13.3 mi)	

=== Europe ===
Country	Location	System	Year opened	Lines	Stations	Length	Notes
Austria	Gmunden	Traunsee Tram	21 March 1912	1	-	17.9 km (11.1 mi)	Since (1 September 2018) it has been connected to the Gmunden Tramway as part of the Traunseetram tram-train service.
Austria	Vienna	Badner Bahn	1873	1	36	30.4 km (18.9 mi)	Baden bei Wien
Denmark	Aarhus	Aarhus Letbane	21 December 2017	2	51	110 km (68 mi)	Tram-train and light rail
France	Lyon	Rhônexpress	9 August 2010	1	4	23 km (14 mi)	
France	Lyon	Tram-train de l'ouest lyonnais	22 September 2012	2	23	55 km (34 mi)	
France	Mulhouse	Mulhouse Thur Valley Tram-Train	12 December 2010	Line 3	18	22 km (14 mi)	Tram of Mulhouse tramway and Mulhouse Thur Valley Tram-train
France	Nantes	Nantes tram-train	15 June 2011	2	18	64 km (40 mi)	
France	Paris, Île-de-France	Île-de-France tramway Line 4	20 November 2006	line 4	20	13.3 km (8.3 mi)	
France	Paris, Île-de-France	Île-de-France tramway Line 11 Express	1 July 2017	Line 11	7	11 km (6.8 mi)	
France	Paris, Île-de-France	Île-de-France tramway Line 12 Express	10 December 2023	Line 12	16	20 km (12 mi)	
France	Paris, Île-de-France	Île-de-France tramway Line 13 Express	6 July 2022	Line 13	12	18.8 km (11.7 mi)	
France	Paris, Île-de-France	Île-de-France tramway Line 14	March 2025	Line 14	5	9.9 km (6.2 mi)	
Germany	Chemnitz	City-Bahn Chemnitz	10 March 1997	4	-	-	
Germany	Karlsruhe	Karlsruhe Stadtbahn	25 September 1992	12	190	262.4 km (163.0 mi)	
Germany	Kassel	Kassel RegioTram	2006	3	-	184 km (114 mi)	
Germany	Nordhausen	Trams in Nordhausen	25 August 1900	3	32	22.4 km (13.9 mi)	
Germany	Saarbrücken	Saarbahn	24 October 1997	1	43	44.0 km (27.3 mi)	
Hungary	Szeged, Hódmezővásárhely	Szeged-Hódmezővásárhely tram-train	29 November 2021	1		31.6 km (19.6 mi)	
Italy	Bergamo	Bergamo–Albino light rail	24 April 2009	1	16	12.5 km (7.8 mi)	
Italy	Rome	Rome–Giardinetti railway	1916	1	19	5.4 km (3.4 mi)	Closed; 2015 (Centocelle-Giardinetti)
Italy	Sassari	Metrosassari	27 October 2006	1	8	4.331 km (2.691 mi)	
Netherlands	The Hague-Rotterdam	RandstadRail	29 October 2006	4	73	71 km (44 mi)	
Portugal	Porto	Porto Metro Line B/Bx - (Estádio do Dragão – Póvoa de Varzim)	13 March 2005	1	36	33.6 km (20.9 mi)	Bombardier Flexity Swift light rail
Portugal	Porto	Porto Metro Line C - (Campanhã – Ismai)	30 July 2005	1	24	19.6 km (12.2 mi)	Bombardier Flexity Swift light rail
Spain	Alicante	Alicante Tram Line 1 (Alicante Metropolitan Tram - Luceros – Benidorm)	30 July 2007	1	20	19.6 km (12.2 mi)	
Spain	Alicante	Alicante Metropolitan Tram - Luceros – El Campello	2003	1	17	14.404 km (8.950 mi)	
Spain	Mallorca	Mallorca rail network, Serveis Ferroviaris de Mallorca	1994	3	29	85 km (53 mi)	Ferrocarril de Sóller
Spain	Cádiz	Cádiz Bay tram-train	26 October 2022	1	21	24 km (15 mi)	
United Kingdom	Sheffield - Rotherham	South Yorkshire Supertram	25 October 2018	1	15	29 km (18 mi)	Tram-Train (Black) Route
United Kingdom	Cardiff & South Wales Valleys	South Wales Metro	2026	5	94	112.6 km (70.0 mi)	Mixed system of light rapid transit tram-train lines and commuter rail lines. The data displayed is only including the lines and system length of the network operated by tram-trains.

=== North America ===
Country	Location	System	Year opened	Lines	Stations	Length	Notes
Canada	Ottawa	Line 2 (O-Train)	15 October 2001	1	11	19 km (12 mi)	O-Train, Diesel light
Canada	Ottawa	Line 4 (O-Train)	6 January 2025	1	3	4 km (2.5 mi)	O-Train, Diesel light
Canada	Waterloo Region	Ion rapid transit	21 June 2019	1	19	19 km (12 mi)	Light rail
Mexico	Puebla	Puebla–Cholula Tourist Train	23 January 2017	1	2	17.4 km (10.8 mi)	(Closed; 31 December 2021; trains now sold to Tren Interoceánico)
United States	Camden-Trenton, New Jersey	River Line (NJ Transit)	14 March 2004	1	21	55 km (34 mi)	Custom Stadler GTW, Diesel light
United States	San Diego, California	San Diego Trolley	26 July 1981	4	62	105 km (65 mi)	

=== South America ===
Country	Location	System	Year opened	Lines	Stations	Length	Notes
Colombia	Bogotá	RegioTram	-	-	17	39.6 km (24.6 mi)	

== Proposed systems ==
=== Africa ===
- The October 6th Tram system (The O6T), Cairo, Egypt

=== Asia ===
- Haifa–Nazareth, Israel
- Keelung Mass Rapid Transit (Nangang-Keelung), Taiwan

=== Europe ===
- Braunschweig, Germany
- Bratislava, Slovakia
- Cardiff, United Kingdom. Wales & Borders franchise: South Wales Valley Lines (2022 - 2023) - rolling stock currently under construction.
- Debrecen, Hungary
- Edinburgh, United Kingdom – an extension of the Edinburgh Trams network via the South Suburban line.
- Erlangen, Germany – an extension of Straßenbahn Nürnberg not initially planned to use mainline rail tracks but proposed to do so in the future. The planned line to Herzogenaurach replicates a former mainline rail line
- Faro, Portugal
- Gorzów Wielkopolski, Poland
- Greater Manchester, United Kingdom. Proposed extensions to the Manchester Metrolink network.
- Grenoble, France
- Groningen, Netherlands
- Kiel, Germany
- Kyiv, Ukraine
- Košice, Slovakia (in planning phase)
- León, Spain
- Liberec — Jablonec nad Nisou, Czech Republic
- Linköping, Sweden
- Linz, Austria (in planning phase)
- Manresa, Spain
- Metro de Sevilla. Seville has one metro line and one tram line that are not connected, but the long-term intention is to link the metro and tram systems.
- Oradea, Romania - The first Romanian tram-train will be in Oradea, featuring several lines, and connecting the city to the villages near, like Borș, Băile Felix or Sântandrei. The tram-train in Oradea is in planning phase, some parts of the project already accepted by the local government.
- Riga, Latvia
- RijnGouweLijn, Netherlands
- Sevastopol
- Strasbourg, France
- Szeged, Hungary. Two other destinations are being considered as of January 2022 besides the Szeged - Hódmezővásárhely line, which entered operation in November 2021. The Szeged - Subotica (Serbia) line is in early planning phase. A preparatory study was also completed for the Szeged - Makó line, but the estimated costs were high, and it is also dependent on a new road-rail bridge over the river Tisa only in planning phase as of now.
- TramCamp, Camp de Tarragona, Catalonia, Spain
- Wrocław, Poland (2005) — 600 V DC/3 kV DC
- Turku, Finland
- West Midlands conurbation, United Kingdom. Proposed extensions to the West Midlands Metro to Stourbridge and Walsall.

=== Oceania ===
- Adelaide, South Australia – On June 5, 2008, the Government of South Australia announced plans for train-tram operation on the Adelaide Metro's Outer Harbor/Grange train lines and City West-Glenelg tramline extension as part of a 10-year A$2 billion public transport upgrade.
- Hobart, Tasmania

=== South America ===
- Bogotá Commuter Rail (RegioTram), Colombia
- Cali, Colombia

== Vehicles ==
Models of tram designed for tram-train operation include:

- Alstom's RegioCitadis and Citadis Dualis, derived from the Citadis
- Bombardier Flexity Link and Bombardier Flexity Swift
- Siemens S70
- Stadler Citylink

== Interurban ==
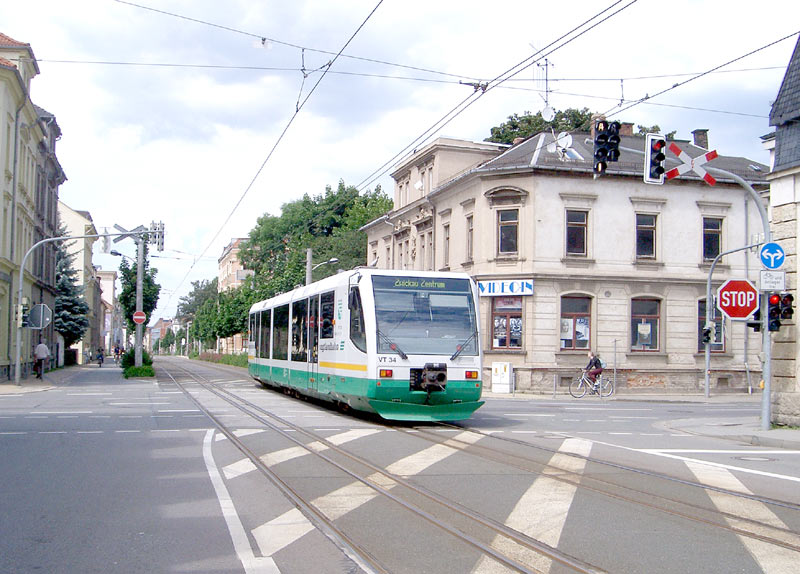
The Zwickau Model has lightweight diesel trains running through urban streets.

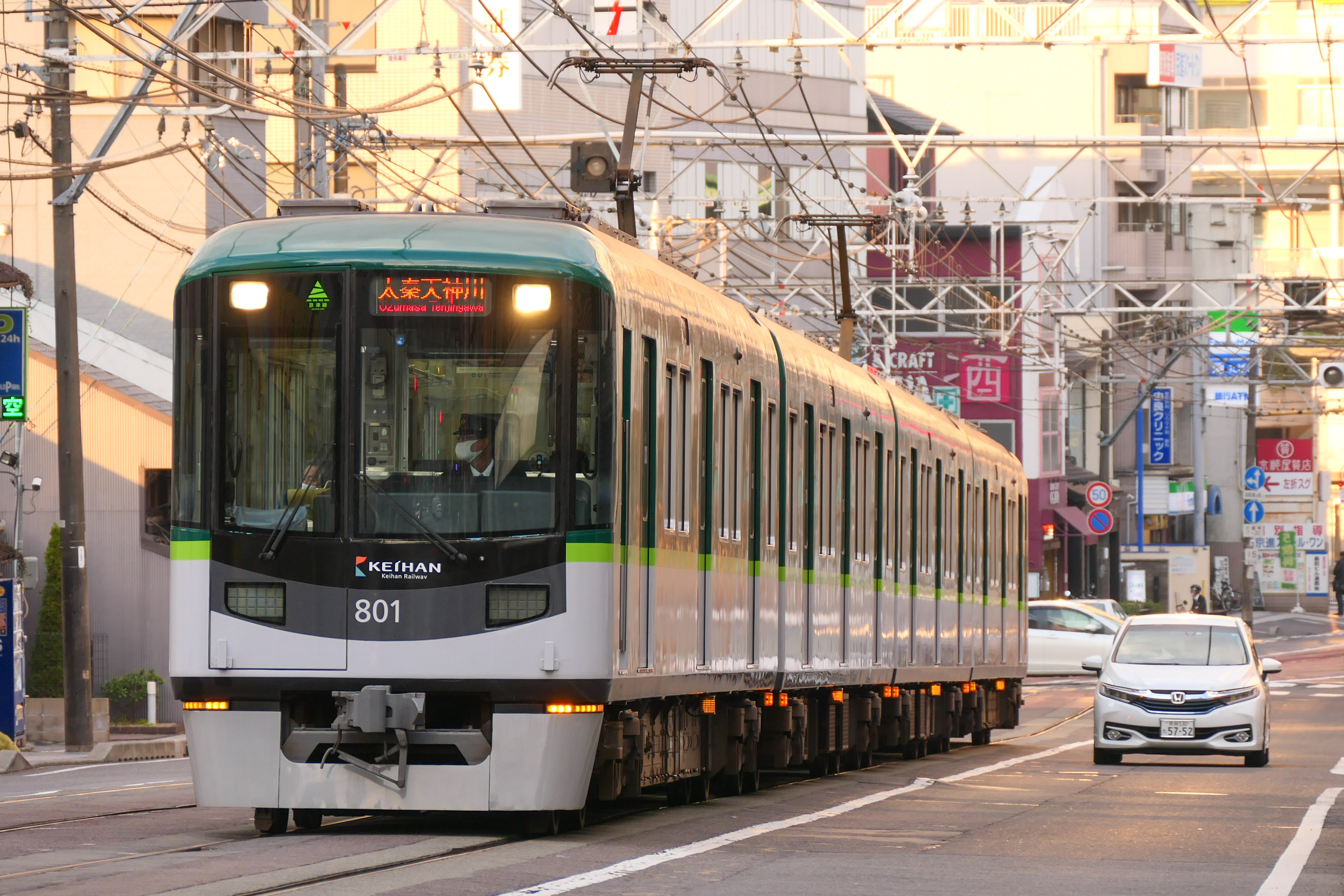
A train running on the street section of Keishin line

=== Europe ===
- Chur: Chur–Arosa railway line
- Bad Doberan: Molli railway
- Helsingør: Hornbæk Line
- Zwickau: Trams in Zwickau, with an on-board diesel generator (light-weight RegioSprinter diesel railbuses that also operate on street tramway)

=== Japan ===
- Kyoto: Keihan Electric Railway - Keishin Line that having sections which trains runs on street level.

=== North America ===
- Austin, Texas: Capital MetroRail – commuter rail that shares more commonality with train-tram operation, with downtown street running and usage of mainline track. Uses diesel multiple units.

== See also ==
- Grooved rail
- Interurban
- Light rail
- Stadtbahn
