= Zwickau Model =

Operation of heavy-rail trains on tram lines

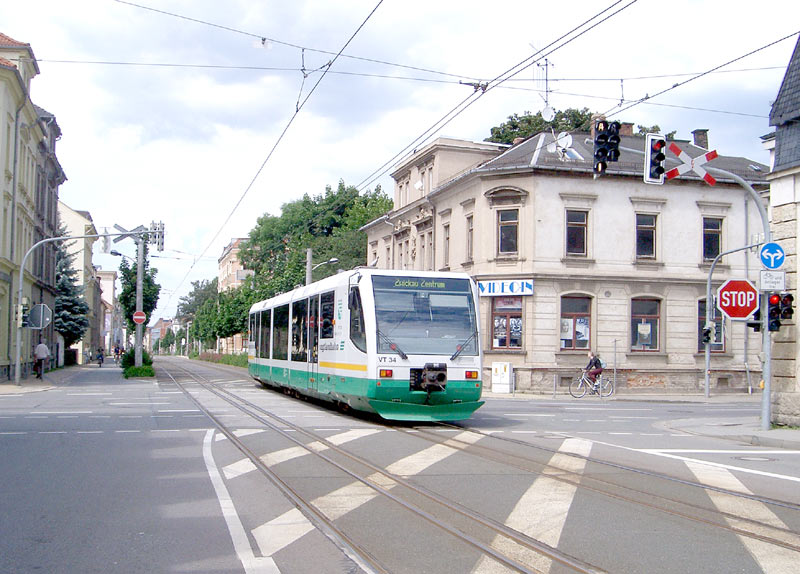
A mainline railcar operating in the streets of Zwickau.

The Zwickau model, or train-tram, is an inversion of the tram-train. Instead of tram vehicles running on railway tracks, the Zwickau model features main-line trains extended through city streets on tram tracks. The trains have only minor modifications to permit use on the tram tracks. It is so called because the German city of Zwickau was the first to introduce the concept.

In Zwickau diesel regional trains operated by Die Länderbahn use around 1.1 km (0.68 mi) of tramway track to reach the city centre instead of terminating at the railway station. As the city's tramway network is metre gauge the shared section of track is dual gauge, but that is not a necessary feature of the model.

Train-tram operation in Zwickau began on 28 May 1999 using RegioSprinter railcars fitted with a modified braking system, indicators and a bell in order to operate under the BOStrab tramway regulations. Since 2019 the service has been operated by Regio-Shuttles, also modified for use on the tramway section.

== See also ==
- Street running train
- Tram-train, an inverse concept
