= Stadler Citylink =

Model of tram-train

Citylink
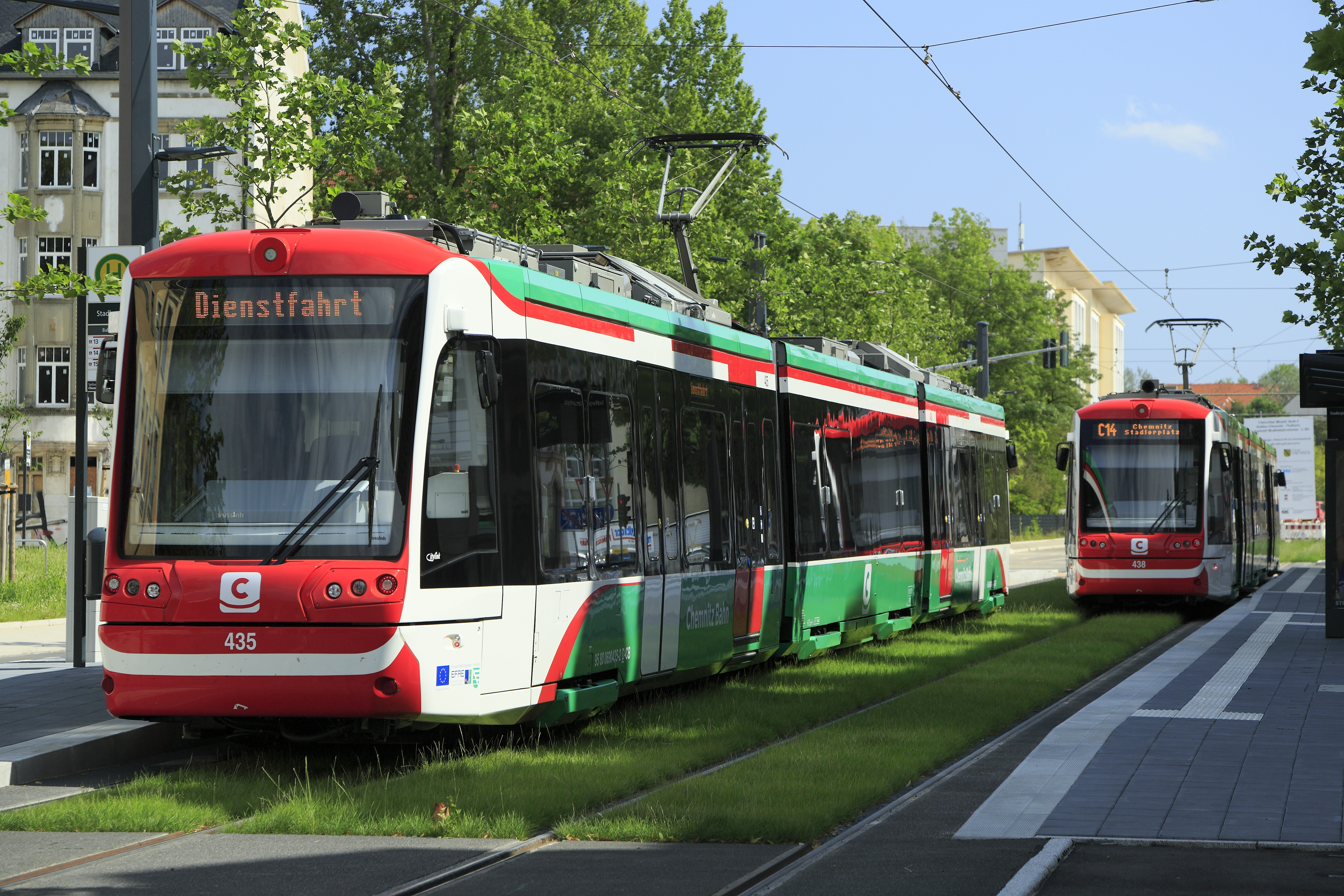
- Citylink in Chemnitz in 2017
- Stock type: EMU, (Note: For the South Wales Metro) tram-train, tram (Note: In Aarhus and Salt Lake City)
- Manufacturers: Vossloh (2006–2015); Stadler (2015–present)
- Assembly: Albuixech, Spain; Salt Lake City, U.S. (U.S. market)
- Built at: Stadler Rail Valencia SAU
- Entered service: 2006

Specifications
- Low-floor: 50% - 100%
- Articulated sections: 3-4
- Maximum speed: 80 km/h (50 mph); 100 km/h (62 mph); 110 km/h (68 mph)
- Electric systems: Overhead line: 600 V DC; 750 V DC; 1000 V DC (Note: For Salzburg); 1,500 V DC (Note: For Mallorca); 15 kV 16.7 Hz AC; 25 kV 50 Hz AC; Battery (Note: For Aarhus and the South Wales Metro); Diesel engine
- Current collection: Pantograph
- Minimum turning radius: 22 m (72 ft)
- Track gauge: 1,000 mm (3 ft 3 3/8 in); 1,435 mm (4 ft 8 1/2 in)

The Stadler Citylink (Note: Vossloh Citylink before 2015) is a rail vehicle platform typically used for tram-trains manufactured by Stadler Rail. The design was introduced at Vossloh's Valencia factory in the 2000s before its sale to Stadler Rail in 2015. Stadler has continued to market the model since then. Most vehicles remain produced in Valencia, however vehicles for the US market are expected to be assembled at Stadler's Salt Lake City facility. Given its top speed of 100–110 km/h (62–68 mph) the Citylink mainly sees use in interurban-like applications as a tram, tram-train, or EMU. First introduced in a metre-gauge variant in Spain, the Citylink is currently also used in standard-gauge variants in Germany, Hungary, Mexico and the United Kingdom, and is on order for systems in Austria, Denmark, and the United States.

The largest operator of the Citylink, as well as its first standard-gauge operator, is the Verkehrsbetriebe Karlsruhe (VBK) of the Karlsruhe Stadtbahn. The Citylink has been the launch rolling-stock of numerous tram-train systems, most notably in Alicante, Sheffield, and Szeged. In 2022, the supply of Citylinks made Stadler's then-largest contract to date, the VDV Tram-Train project involving a consortium of six Austrian and German operators ordering 246 vehicles with an option for a further 258. The deal is worth €4 billion (£3.3 billion).

== History ==
=== Beginnings in Spain ===
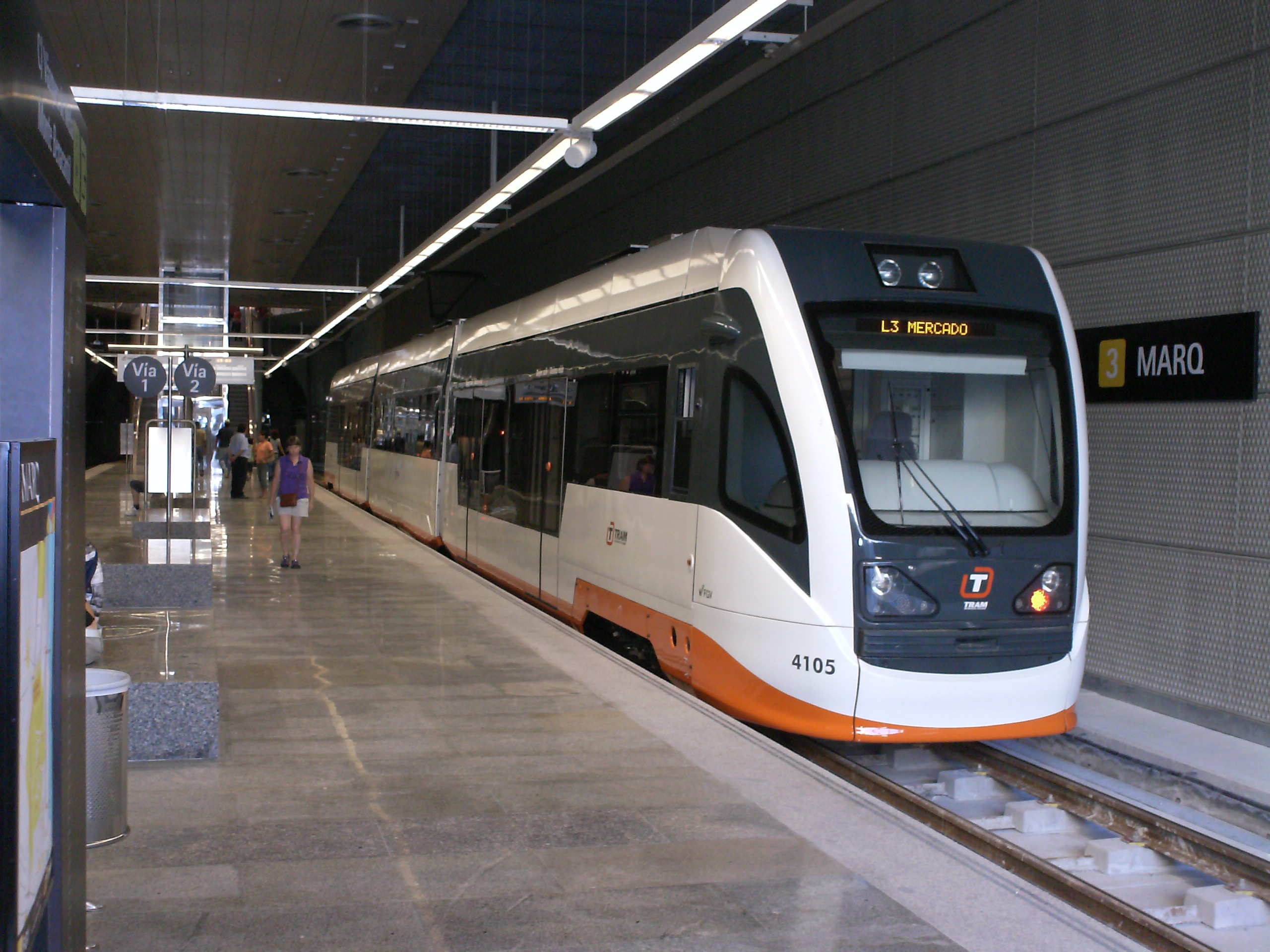
An Alicante Citylink in June 2007

The Ferrocarrils de la Generalitat Valenciana (FGV), the operator of metre-gauge railway lines in the Community of Valencia in Spain, relaunched electric tram service in Alicante in 1999, initially on a trial basis on the right-of-way of the metre-gauge Alicante–Dénia railway line. The trial was successful and in 2001 a permanent tram network commenced construction and opened in 2003 using trams borrowed from Valencia. The initial line entirely used the right of way of the Alicante–Dénia railway line. The incorporation of more the pre-existing line into the tram network demanded interurban-style rolling stock more suitable for the expected 50 km (31 mi) from Alicante to Altea. As such, the first order for 9 units what would later become the Citylink was placed by the FGV from Alstom in April 2003, the vehicles were to seat 99 passengers over a length of 37 m (121 ft) and have a maximum speed of 100 km/h (62 mph). The units were designated the 4100 series and entered service in July 2007. However, in the meantime, Alstom sold the Albuixech factory at which the units were slated to be produced, together with its orderbook, to Vossloh with the sale finalised in April 2005, resulting in Vossloh inheriting the product.

A second order for such trains would come from the Serveis Ferroviaris de Mallorca (SFM) in Mallorca for 6 units in 2009. These are considered largely similar to the trains produced earlier for Alicante, however are equipped to work with the island's 1,500 V DC railway electrification instead of Alicante's 750 V DC. Due to the cancellation of the project for which they were ordered and their boarding-height incompatibility with the significant portions of SFM's infrastructure, they have had a troubled service history and limited service.

The third order for the Citylink would also come from Spain, but would also be troubled. In 2011, FEVE ordered 4 diesel metre-gauge units for use in León. The order would be cancelled with the trains remaining undelivered. However, this is the first time that the Citylink, designed as modular platform, would be ordered with diesel traction.

=== "Citylink" branding ===
By the time of its 2011 annual report, Vossloh was using the name "Citylink" to refer to its tram-train product, with earlier production retroactively designated into that product brand.

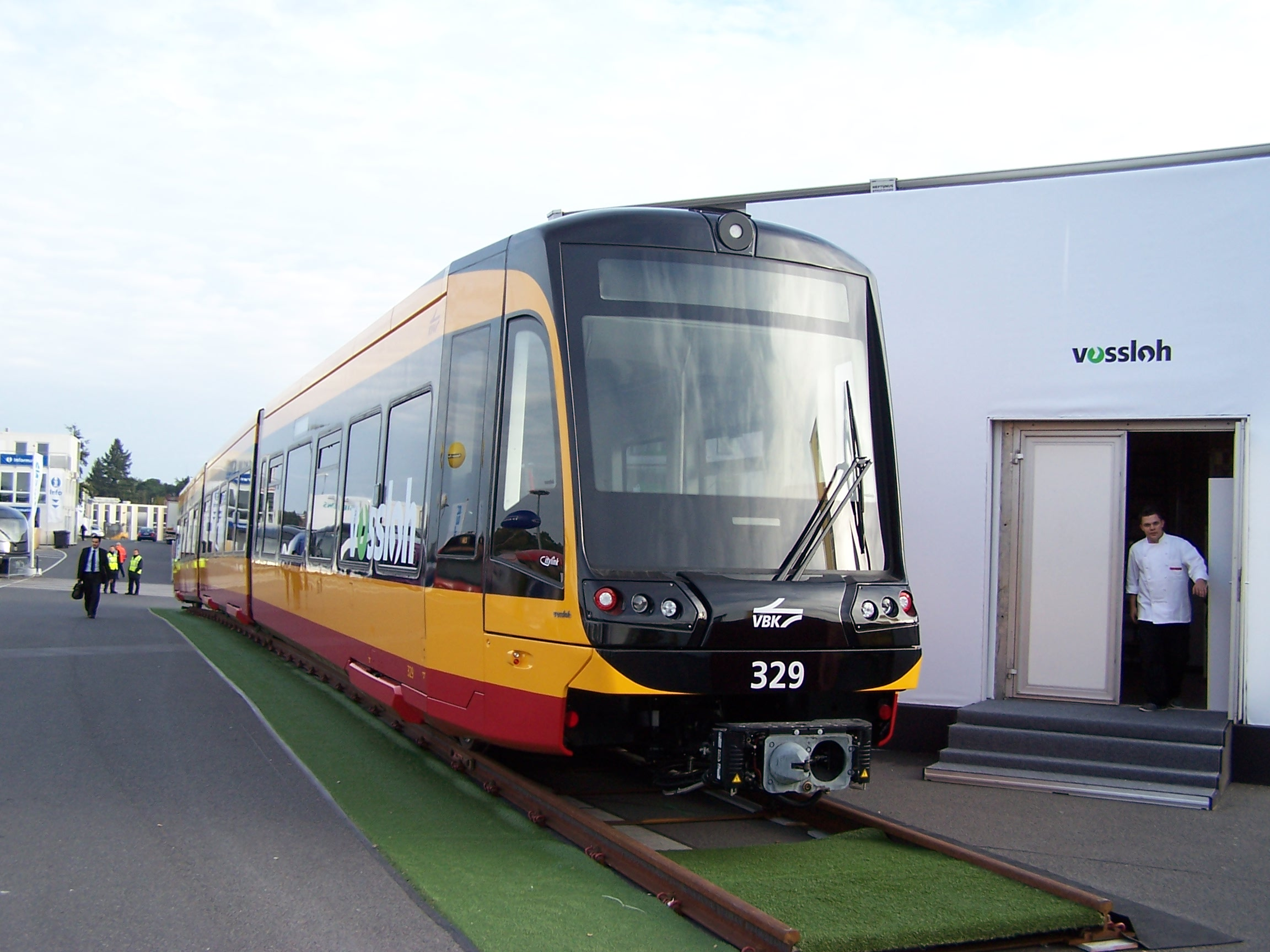
A NET-2012 Citylink exhibiting at InnoTrans 2014

The Citylink would see its first large scale order in October 2011, when the Verkehrsbetriebe Karlsruhe (VBK) ordered 25 standard-gauge vehicles for use on the Karlsruhe Stadtbahn from Vossloh. The model type was named the NET-2012 and the order included options for a further 50 vehicles which were ultimately exercised in batches of 25 in 2015 and 2016. These vehicles retained the Citylink's basic 3-section, 37 m (121 ft) layout, but unlike previous versions are standard gauge, have a lower maximum speed of only 80 km/h (50 mph) and are unidirectional. The first dual-mode Citylinks were ordered by Verkehrsverbund Mittelsachsen (VMS) for Chemnitz in 2012. The order was for 8 vehicles with an option for a further 4, which was exercised in 2016. In addition to 600 V DC and 750 V DC operation, the vehicles are equipped with a two power packs each containing a 390 kW (520 hp) diesel engine for a total off-wire power of 780 kW (1,050 hp).

The first Citylinks equipped for AC electrification were ordered from Vossloh by the South Yorkshire Passenger Transport Executive (SYPTE) in 2013 for the Sheffield Supertram. Making the Citylink to be the launch vehicle of the UK's first tram-train system. The vehicles are equipped for 25 kV 50 Hz AC mainline railway electrification in addition to 750 V DC tram electrification. They were also the fastest Citylink vehicles until that time with Vossloh listing a design speed of 110 km/h (68 mph), albeit a service speed of only 100 km/h (62 mph).

=== Stadler production ===
In November 2015, Vossloh announced it would sell its rail vehicles business to Stadler as part of a corporate reorganisation which involved divesting its transportation division, which also included Kiepe and MaK, to be sold later. As a result, Stadler inherited Citylink production and the Albuixech factory.

Stadler's first new sale of Citylinks, not including the exercise of options, was of 8 (with an option of 4) units for the Szeged-Hódmezővásárhely tram-train in May 2017, similar in characteristics to Chemnitz's. (Note: With the same length, width, maximum speed, voltage capabilities, and a seat arrangement differing by only two seats.) In September 2017 FGV of Alicante also ordered 6 additional units, but of a bimodal type.

The first high-floor Citylinks were ordered in January of 2019 by Transport for Wales (TfW), when an order for 36 units with a boarding height of 914 mm (3 ft) was placed. The units are also the first Citylink units to be equipped for off-wire operation using batteries, rather than a diesel engine.

==== VDV Tram-train ====
In 2020, four German and two Austrian transit operators: the VBK and AVG of Karlsruhe, the Saarbahn, Schiene Oberösterreich, the state of Salzburg, and the Zweckverband Regional-Stadtbahn Neckar-Alb, banded for a joint procurement of up to 508 tram-train vehicles in order to leverage economies of scale. This tender became known as the VDV Tram-train. Stadler was announced as the winner of this tender with the Citylink platform in January 2022, by which time it had turned into 246 firm orders and 248 options with delivery schedules over the length of 10 years starting in 2024. The following contract, with its value of abot 4 billion Euros, became the largest in Stadler's history.

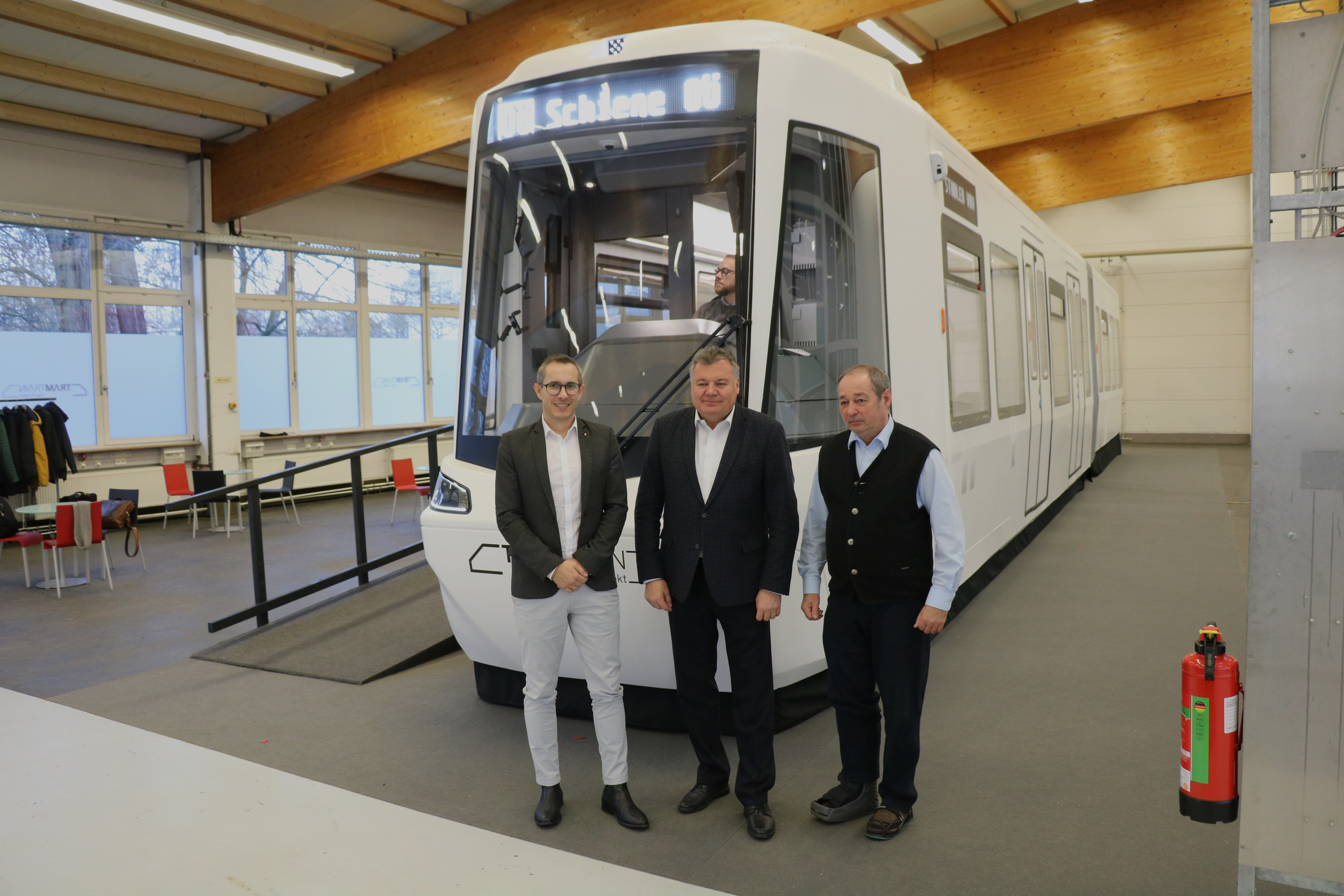
Officials from Upper Austria visiting the VDV Tram-train mockup train in Karlsruhe, January 2023

The vehicles are expected to share the same bogie configuration, vehicle size, and maximum speed but otherwise differ between manufacturer in terms of motor arrangements, seating arrangements, and voltages.

A full-scale mockup of the VDV Tram-train vehicle was presented in Karlruhe in December 2022.

In March 2022, VMS of Chemnitz ordered a second series of 19 Citylinks. These are considered similar to the VDV Tram-train specification, as Chemnitz was expected to take part in the tender but ultimately did not. Unlike Chemnitz's earlier series, these are equipped for 15 kV 16.7 Hz AC instead of with a diesel engine, leading VMS to term them the series the "eCitylink".

==== Variable length ====
In late 2024, Stadler announced its first sale of an electric tram in the United States. The Utah Transit Authority (UTA) ordered 20 Citylink units with an option for a further 40 from Stadler ahead of a Siemens bid for their S700. This would be the first time the Citylink would be produced to shorter than its typical 37 m (121 ft) length, as UTA opted for a 25 m (83 ft) length.

The first Citylink sets with a length longer than standard of four sections were announced separately within a week of each other in December 2025 for the Aarhus light rail and the Regionaltangente West project in Frankfurt.

== Design ==
During a rail vehicle conference at TU Graz in 2016, shortly after the product's acquisition by Stadler, the Citylink was presented in contrast to the Tramlink, the other tram platform in Vossloh's former portfolio, as a stadtbahn (light rail), as opposed to the Tramlink's presentation as a strassenbahn (streetcar). The Citylink differentiates from the Tramlink by having a higher operating speeds, a layout designed for seating comfort, and a higher clearance to comply with the German mainline rail (EBO) standards in addition to German tramway (BOStrab) standards.

=== Carbody ===
The Citylink, being a modular platform, is available and has been produced in varied body-style configurations. In 2016, the "standard" version was considered to be 37 m (121 ft) long and 2.65 m (8.7 ft) wide over three segments. Though Stadler also presented the possibility of shorter and longer configurations at the time, up to 50 m (160 ft) in length with four segments. In 2025, Stadler presented a wider range of possible lengths, from 25 m (82 ft) to 70 m (230 ft) over between three and five segments.

The Citylink can also be produced to different track gauges, with models having been produced for metre-gauge networks in Mallorca, Alicante and León, (Note: The units for León were never delivered) and standard-gauge networks elsewhere.

In 2016, the "standard" version of the Citylink had 5 doors per side, the same as the NET-2012 in Karlsruhe. However, most versions produced to date have had only 4 doors per side, for example as for Mallorca or Sheffield. For the VDV Tram-train, all versions, except the one for the VBK in Karlsruhe, will have 4 doors per side, the version for the VBK will have 5.

=== Operation ===
The Citylink was designed as an electric multiple unit tram-train, with power able to be drawn from overhead line equipment at 750 V DC or 1,500 V DC. Some Citylinks are fitted with transformers to provide dual-voltage capability, such as those used in Sheffield, which run at 750 V DC on the city's tram network, but with the ability to also use 25 kV 50 Hz AC in the future, as is standard for British railways. In Chemnitz, Citylinks are fitted with a diesel engine as well as 750 V DC overhead power to provide hybrid-electric capability; while vehicles sold in Mexico are fitted with a diesel engine only due to a complete lack of railway electrification. Citylinks have a top speed of 110 km/h (68 mph) when operating on interurban routes under electric power.

=== Interior ===
Specifications vary depending on the operator; for example, the Citylinks operating in Sheffield are outfitted internally similarly to the city's existing trams, due to the relatively short length of the tram-train extension to Rotherham, while Citylinks that operate over longer distances can be equipped with facilities such as toilets and luggage racks. Depending on the internal layout, Citylinks can have a capacity of up to 250 passengers normally, though 4-section versions on order for Frankfurt and Aarhus are expected to have capacities of 352 and 360 passengers respectively.

Citylink interior

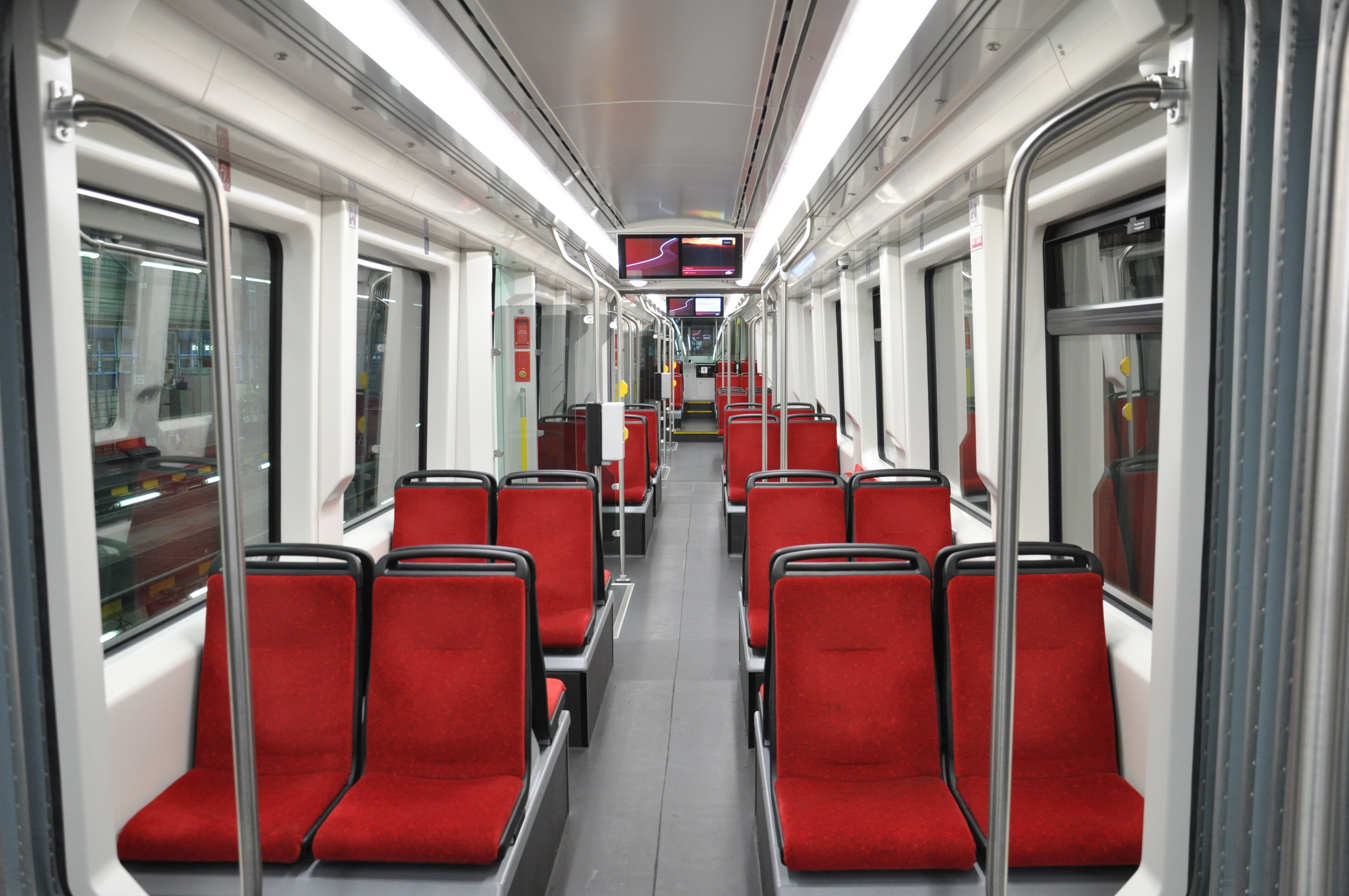
Urban-configuration interior of a NET-2012

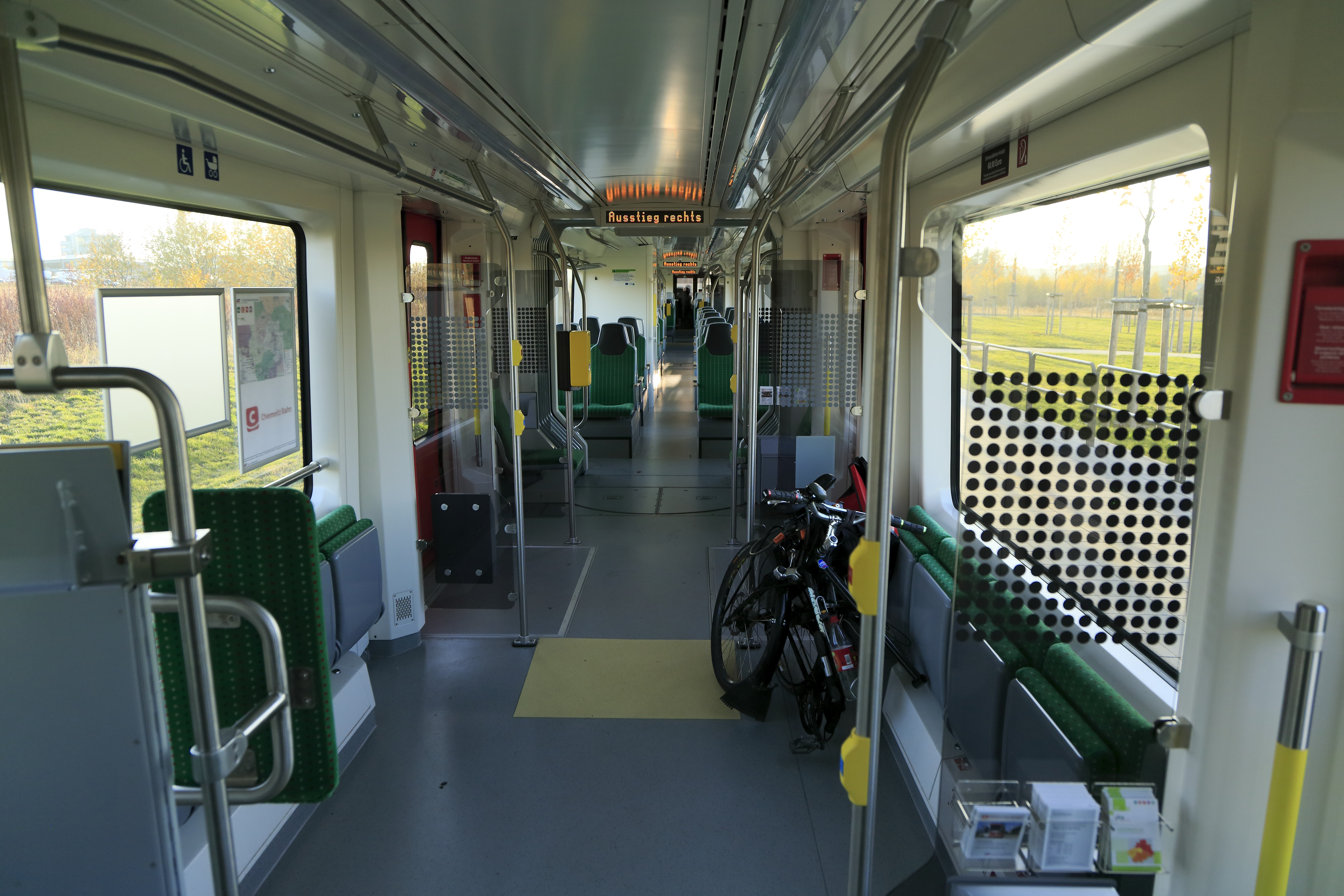
Interurban-configuration interior of a Chemnitz Citylink

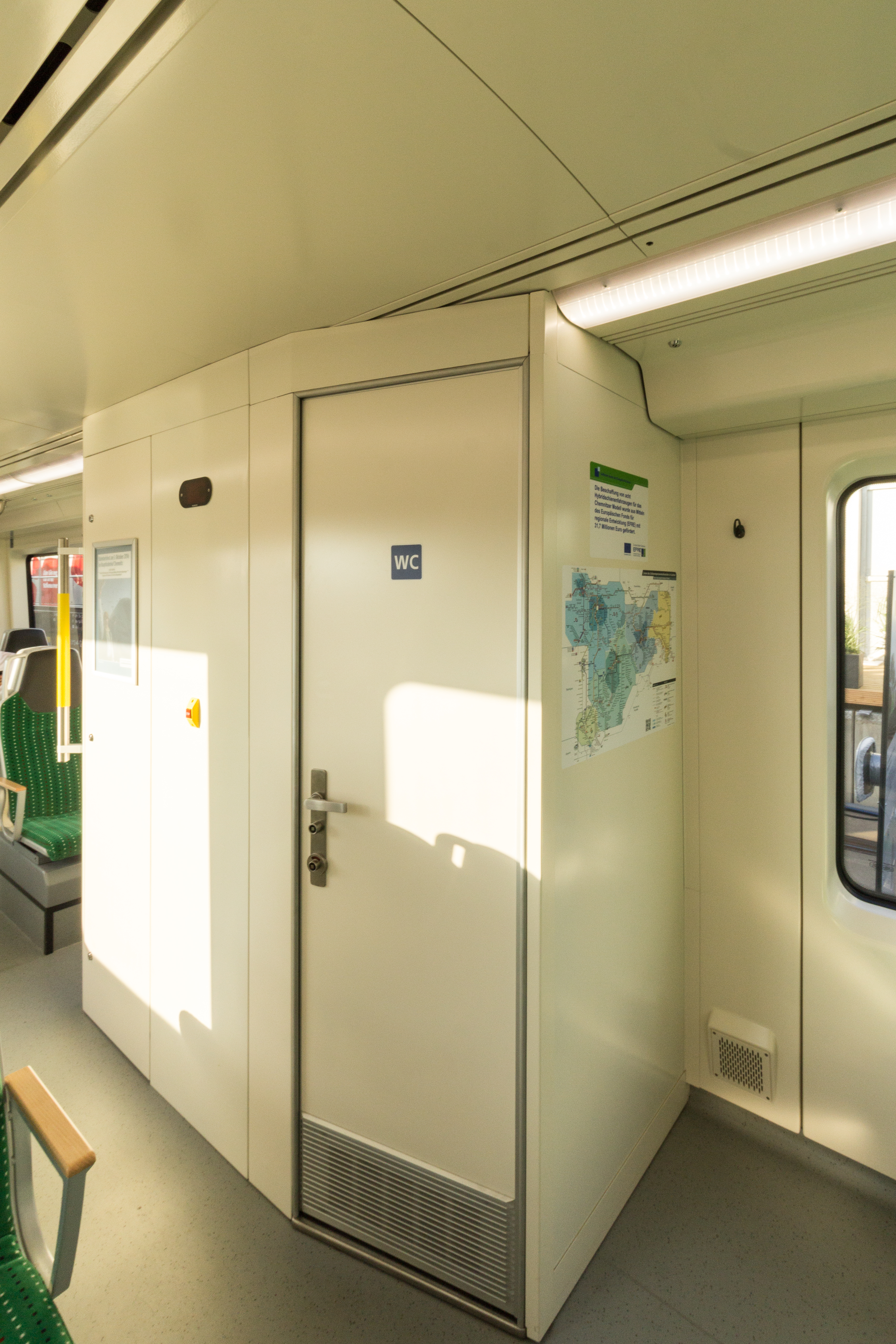
Bathroom inside of a Chemnitz Citylink

== Operations ==
Countries with systems that operate the Stadler Citylink Countries with systems that have the Stadler Citylink on order

As of mid-2026, the Stadler Citylink is operated in nine different systems across five different countries in Europe and North America, while a further seven systems in another four countries have the model on order or undergoing testing.

Orders and operations of the Stadler Citylink
Country	City/System	Image	Quantity	Order date	Service	Gauge	Sections	Voltage	Off-wire capability	Ref.
Austria	Linz (Lokalbahn)		20	2022		1,435 mm	3	750 V DC 15 kV 16.7 Hz AC	no	
Austria	Salzburg (Lokalbahn)		20	2022		1,435 mm	3	750 V DC 1000 V DC	no	
Denmark	Aarhus (Letbane)		8 (option for 12 more)	2025	2029	1,435 mm	4	750 V DC	battery	
Germany	Chemnitz (Chemnitz Bahn)		8	2012	2016	1,435 mm	3	600 V DC 750 V DC	diesel engine	
Germany	Chemnitz (Chemnitz Bahn)		4	2015 (Note: Exercising of options from original contract)	2020	1,435 mm	3	600 V DC 750 V DC	diesel engine	
Germany	Chemnitz (Chemnitz Bahn)		19	2022	2027	1,435 mm	3	600 V DC 750 V DC 15 kV 16.7 Hz AC	no	
Germany	Frankfurt (Regionaltangente West)		27	2025	2028	1,435 mm	4	750 V DC 15 kV 16.7 Hz AC	no	
Germany	Karlsruhe (tram-train)		25	2011	2014	1,435 mm	3	750 V DC	no	
Germany	Karlsruhe (tram-train)		25	2015	2016	1,435 mm	3	750 V DC	no	
Germany	Karlsruhe (tram-train)		25	2016	2017	1,435 mm	3	750 V DC	no	
Germany	Karlsruhe (tram-train)		73	2022		1,435 mm	3	750 V DC	no	
Germany	Karlsruhe (tram-train)		75	2022	2026	1,435 mm	3	750 V DC 15 kV 16.7 Hz AC	no	
Germany	Reutlingen		30	2022		1,435 mm	3	750 V DC 15 kV 16.7 Hz AC	no	
Germany	Saarbrücken (Saarbahn)		28	2022	2026	1,435 mm	3	750 V DC 15 kV 16.7 Hz AC	no	
Hungary	Szeged (tram-train)		8	2017	2021	1,435 mm	3	600 V DC	diesel engine	
Hungary	Szeged (tram-train)		4	2020	2022	1,435 mm	3	600 V DC	diesel engine	
Mexico	Puebla (Cholula tourist train)		2	2014	2017 (Note: Operation ended in 2021)	1,435 mm	3	—	diesel engine	
Mexico	Tren Interoceánico		2	—N/a	2023	1,435 mm	3	—	diesel engine	
Spain	Alicante (tram-train)		9	2003	2007	1,000 mm	3	750 V DC	no	
Spain	Alicante (tram-train)		6	2017	2020	1,000 mm	3	750 V DC	diesel engine	
Spain	León (León tram)		4	2010	—N/a	1,000 mm	3	—	diesel engine	
Spain	Mallorca		6	2009	2012	1,000 mm	3	1,500 V DC	no	
United Kingdom	Sheffield (Supertram)		7	2013	2017	1,435 mm	3	750 V DC 25 kV 50 Hz AC	no	
United Kingdom	Cardiff (South Wales Metro)		36	2018	2026	1,435 mm	3	25 kV 50 Hz AC	battery	
United States	Austin (Project Connect)		21	2026						
United States	Salt Lake City (TRAX)		20	2024	2028	1,435 mm	3	750 V DC	no	
United States	Salt Lake City (TRAX)		20	2025		1,435 mm	3	750 V DC	no	

=== Austria ===
==== Linz (future) ====
Schiene Oberösterreich (Schiene OÖ) was a member of the VDV Tram-train joint-procurement, which was awarded to Stadler in January 2022. Schiene OÖ ordered 20 Citylinks with an option for a further 50. The trains are destined for the Linzer Lokalbahn and Vorchdorferbahn and the Linz Regionalstadtbahn once it is operational and were expected for delivery starting in 2026 and service starting in 2027. The vehicle options are expected to be exercised once the Regionalstadtbahn is complete.

Schiene OÖ opted a boarding height of 550 mm (22 in) and equipment for both 750 V DC and 15 kV 16.7 Hz AC operation, as well as for an internal configuration of 94 seats, one WC, two wheelchair spaces, and luggage racks.

A delivered vehicle was presented at Eferding in March 2026.

==== Salzburg (future) ====
In January 2022, the state government of Salzburg (through arm's-length company Salzburg AG), operator of the Salzburg S-Bahn, announced that they had ordered 20 Stadler Citylinks for their network as part of the VDV tram-train consortium with an option for a further 5 units. The trains are destined for the Salzburger Lokalbahn with delivery expected in 2026. The trains are expected to replace the existing SGP stock on the line, with the 5 options needed in case of a full build-out of the S-Link city tunnel, then under planning. Though S-link itself is currently uncertain after failing a referendum in 2023.

Salzburg opted for an interior configuration similar to Linz, with 94 seats, one WC, two wheelchair spaces, but a lower boarding height of 380 mm (15 in).The trains are only equipped for DC voltage (750 V DC and 1000 V DC).

=== Denmark ===
==== Aarhus (future) ====
On 2 December 2025, Aarhus Letbane entered an agreement with Stadler for the supply of 8 Citylink vehicles, with options for up to 12 more, to the Aarhus Light Rail in Aarhus, in order to increase service frequency. The vehicles will have four segments and a capacity of 152 seated passengers and 180 standees, an increase of 80 over the system's current Stadler Tango trams. The trams are expected in 2029.

The trams will be equipped with an onboard battery pack in order to enable operation in the event of overhead line icing.

=== Germany ===
==== Chemnitz ====
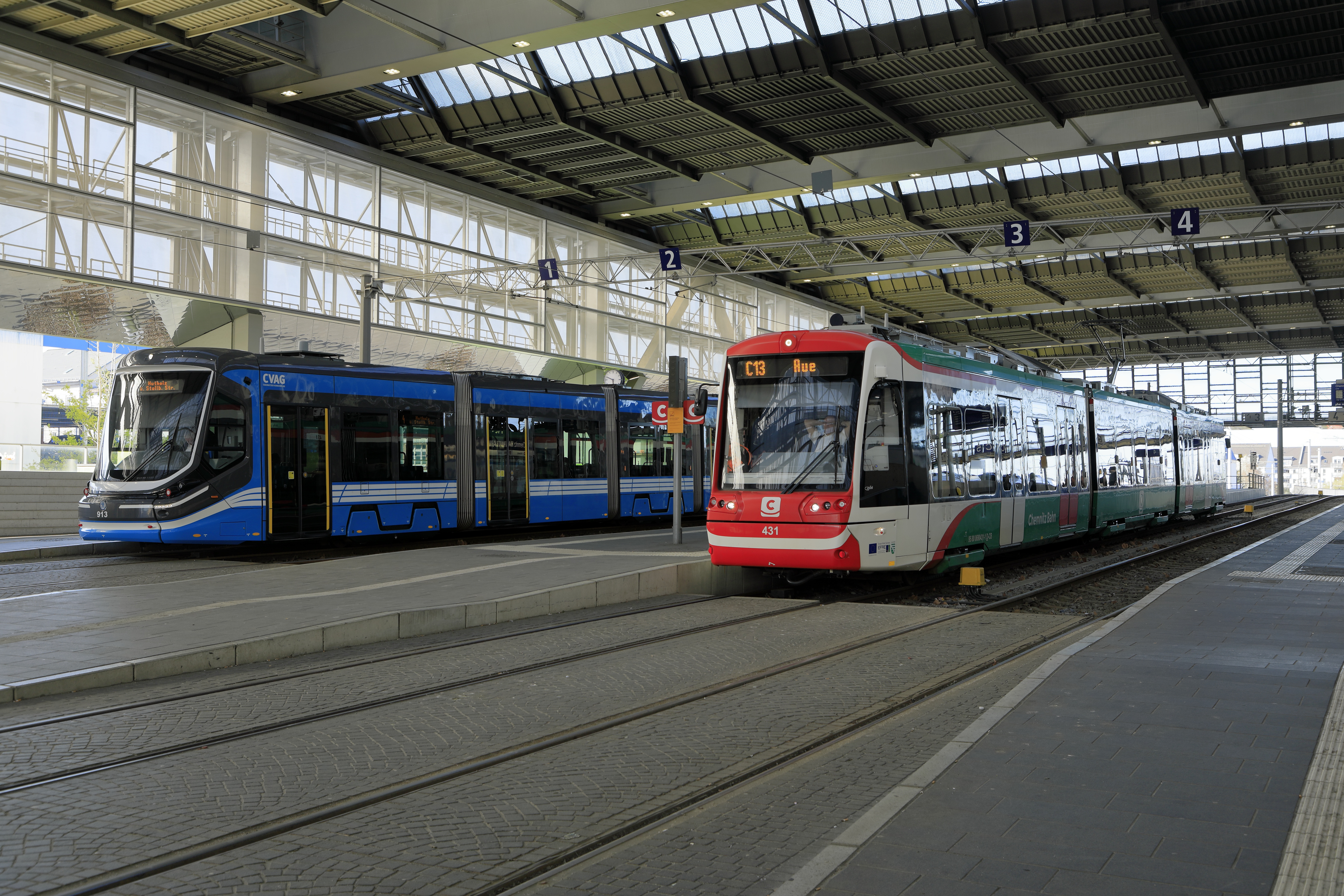
A Citylink at Chemnitz Main station, a switchpoint between tram and train operation, next to the city tramway Škoda 35T (Note: The platforms used by the city trams do not continue onto the train lines, but loop around to the bus station.)

For the phase 1 operation of the "Chemnitz Model" tram-train project, the Verkehrsverbund Mittelsachsen (VMS) contracted Vossloh for the supply of 8 Citylink vehicles in 2012. The contract included an option for a further 4 vehicles which was exercised ahead of phase 2 of the project in 2015. The vehicles are equipped for operation on the city's tramway network, which is electrified at 600 V DC and uses BOStrab, as well as 750 V DC for the line to Stollberg and a two diesel engines for operations on phase 1 lines, all of which use EBO. The maximum speed of the trains is 60 km/h (37 mph) on tram track and 100 km/h (62 mph) on railway track. The first Citylink entered service on the Chemnitz Bahn on 4 April 2016.

The Citylinks are outfitted with 87 seats and toilets, as well as the ability to work with multiple platform heights: the center doors marked in red provide level boarding with railway platforms at 550 mm (22 in), while the edge doors marked white provide level boarding with the tram network which uses a lower height of 435 mm (17.1 in).

===== eCitylink =====
The VMS was originally expected to participate in the VDV Tram-train joint-procurement, however in December 2020 it opted to launch its own tender for 19 vehicles which were to be similar to the Citylinks already existing on the system after the technical and contractual specifications of the VDV Tram-train were found to be too divergent from its own requirements.

On 31 March 2022, the VMS announced a further order for 19 Citylink tram-trains, with an option for a further 27, which will to be delivered from summer 2025. In comparison to the previous Citylinks, these will have a fully electric multi-system for 600 V DC in the city, 750 V DC on the route to Stollberg and 15 kV 16.7 Hz AC in the rest of the surrounding area. The vehicles have a drive power of 900 kW and reach a top speed of 100 km/h. The VMS termed this second series of Citylinks the "eCitylink" for it is fully electric.

The first eCitylink was delivered to Chemnitz in December 2025 and is expected to enter service in 2027 on lines towards Mittweida and Stollberg.

==== Frankfurt (future) ====
On 5 December 2025, the Rhein-Main-Verkehrsverbund (RMV) ordered 27 Citylink units for the Regionaltangente West tram-train project in the Frankfurt area. The first deliveries of the vehicles are expected in 2028 with an entry into service in 2030. The vehicles will be approximately 50 metres long and be able accommodate 360 passengers.

In addition to being dual-system tram-train vehicles, the tram-trains will be able to provide level-boarding to the two different rail platform heights (760mm, 960mm) and the RMV's light-rail platform height (800mm).

==== Karlsruhe ====
===== NET-2012 =====
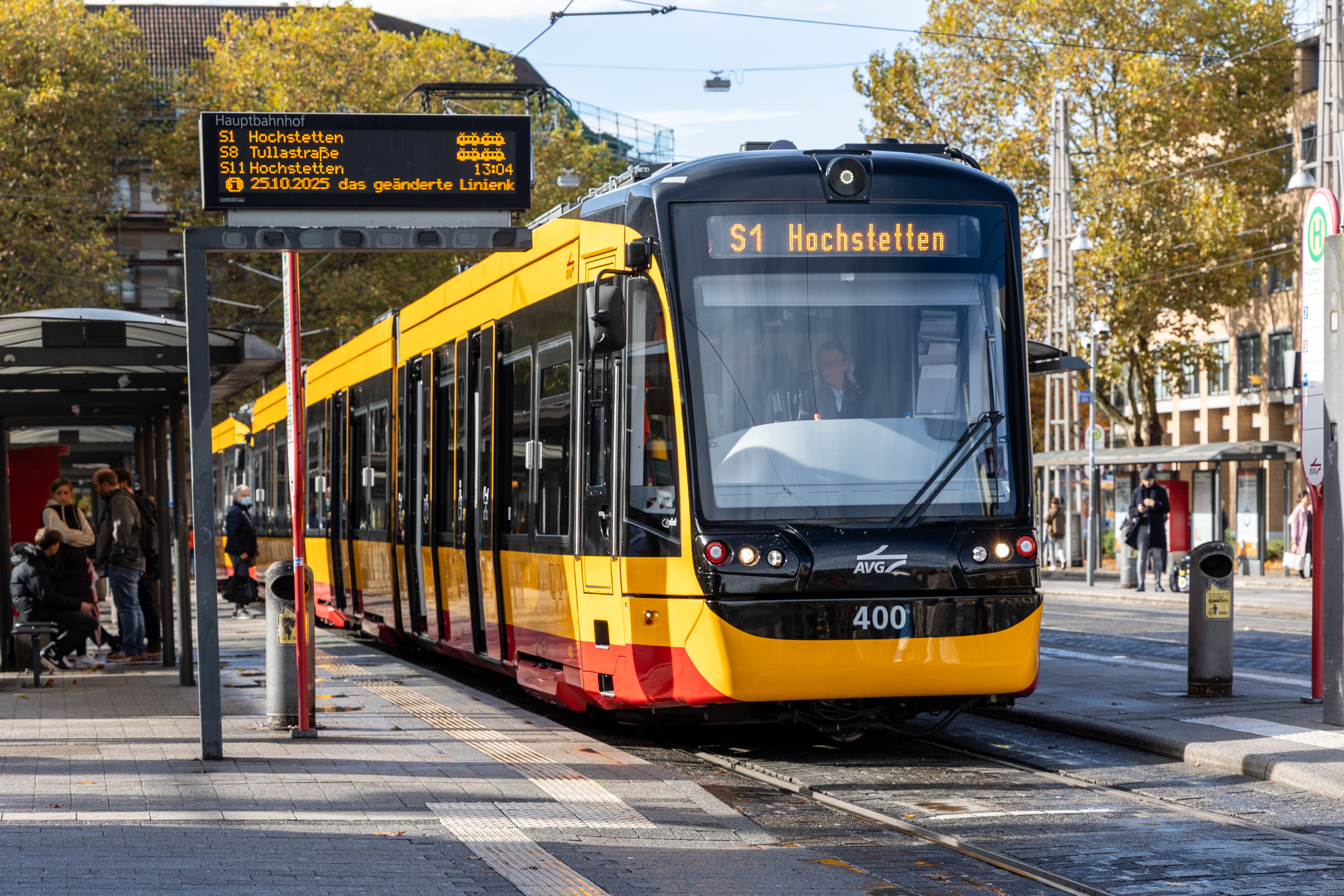
Karlsruhe Citylink no. 400 in 2025

In October 2011, Verkehrsbetriebe Karlsruhe (VBK) ordered 25 Citylink tram-trains from Vossloh for operation on the Karlsruhe Stadtbahn network. The €75 million order also included options for a further 50 Citylinks. These Citylinks were known as the NET-2012, which stands for Niederflur Elektrotriebwagen 2012, German for "low-floor electric railcar." Ultimately, both options were execised in rounds of 25 in 2015 and 2016. The first NET-2012 was delivered to Karlsruhe in May 2014.

===== VDV Tram-train =====
The VBK led the VDV Tram-train joint-procurement project, ordering 73 vehicles as part of it. The tender was awarded to Stadler in January of 2022. The vehicles are expected to be delivered from 2026 with an option for a further 52 vehicles. As part of the same deal, Albtal-Verkehrs-Gesellschaft (AVG), the other primary operator on the Karlsruhe Stadtbahn network, ordered their own 75 Citylinks for the first time, complementing those already in the fleet of VBK.

The VBK and AVG vehicles are expected to have a different specification to each other, in terms of the number of doors, interior outfittings, maximum speeds, and voltage capabilities.

The first AVG Citylink arrived in Karlsruhe in December 2025 was expected to enter testing at that time and be in service by the summer of 2026. The first VBK vehicle was delivered in mid-May 2026.

In May 2026 Urban Transport Magazine reported that AVG exercised 30 of its order options, but could not confirm this.

==== Reutlingen (future) ====
In January 2022, Zweckverband Regional-Stadtbahn Neckar-Alb (RSB), the future operator of a tram-train network between the city of Reutlingen and the town of Tübingen, announced that they had ordered 30 Stadler Citylinks for their network as part of the VDV tram-train consortium with an option for a further 57 units. at the time of signing the trains were expected for delivery in 2027.

==== Saarbrücken ====
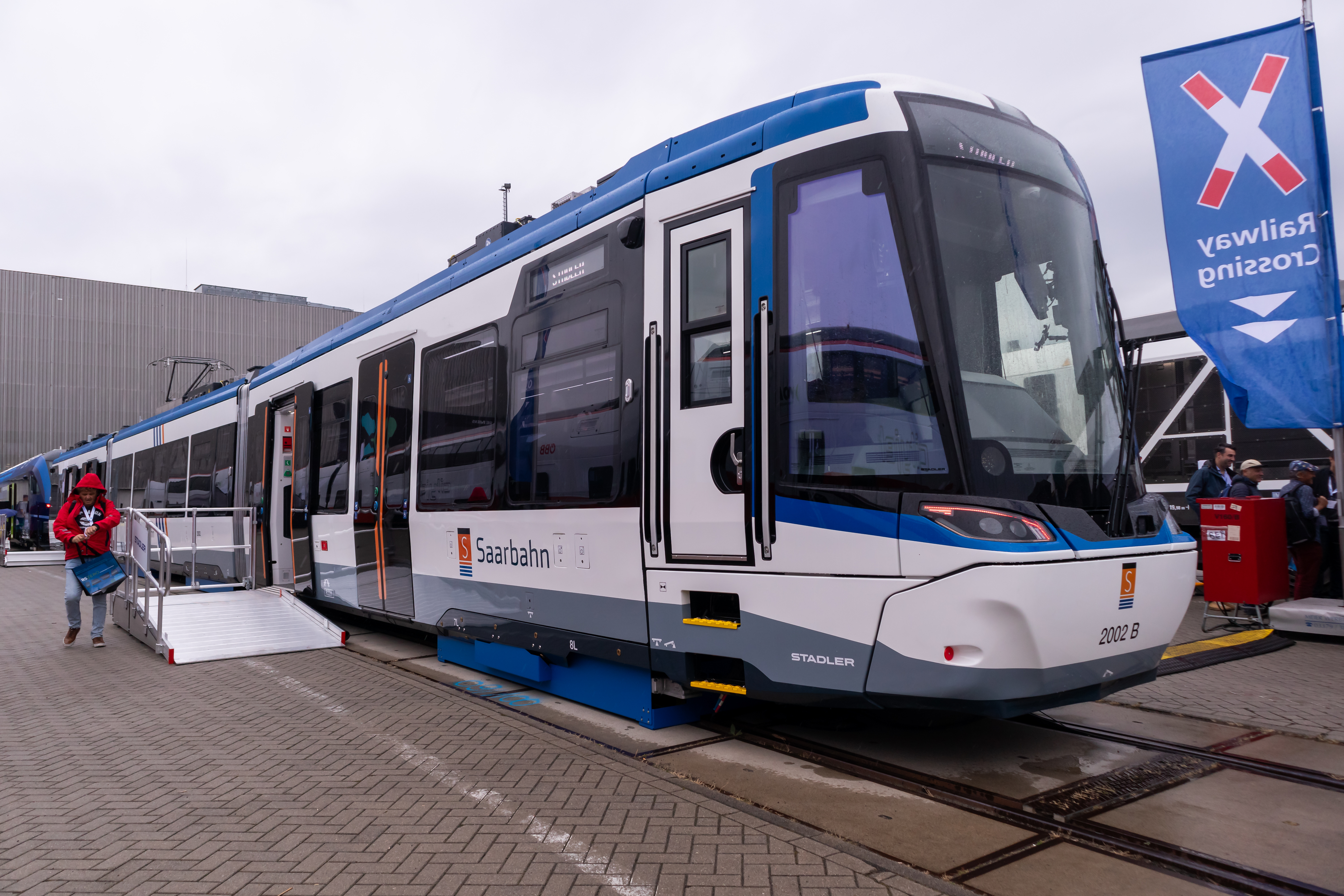
VDV Tram-train Citylink of the Saarbahn exhibiting at InnoTrans 2024

In January 2022, Saarländischer Verkehrsverbund (SaarVV), the operator of the Saarbahn network in Saarbrücken, announced that they had ordered 28 Stadler Citylinks for their network as part of the VDV tram-train consortium with an option for a further 21 units in order to replace existing Flexity Link trams on the system.

The first vehicle was delivered to the Saarbahn in June 2025, although at the time of signing it was expected as early as 2024. The vehicles started limited passenger operations on 11 June 2026 as the first operating vehicles from the VDV tram-train order, albeit only as trams under German BOStrab regulation with their mainline rail certification pending. As of June 2026, four vehicles have been delivered by Stadler.

=== Hungary ===
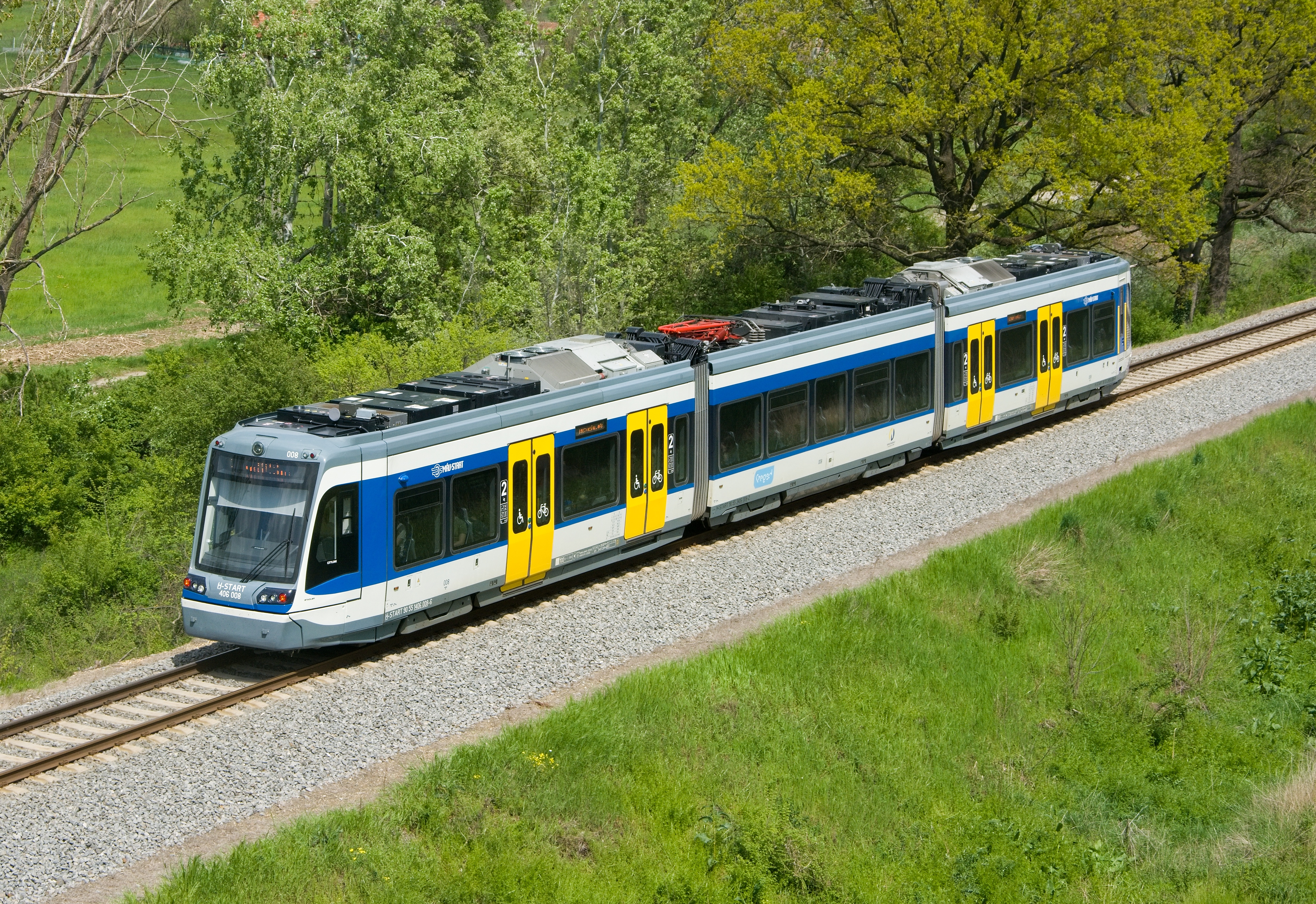
Stadler Citylink tram-train of MÁV

==== Szeged ====
The Hungarian State Railways MÁV-group ordered 8 trains for the tram-train line between Szeged and Hódmezővásárhely with an option for a further 4 in May 2017. The option was exercised in 2020 and the first Citylink was delivered in January 2021. The Tram-train service was opened in the end of November 2021.

=== Mexico ===
Two Citylinks were delivered to the state government in Puebla, Mexico for the Puebla–Cholula Tourist Train in 2015. These are fitted with a diesel engine only, due to a lack of railway electrification in the region, and a revised front end crash structure compared to European models. These were the first tram-trains to be delivered anywhere in the Americas. The operation of the tram line began in January 2017 and ended in December 2021 due to financial reasons. The rolling stock later was transferred to Tren Interoceánico in the states of Veracruz and Oaxaca.

=== Spain ===
==== Alicante ====
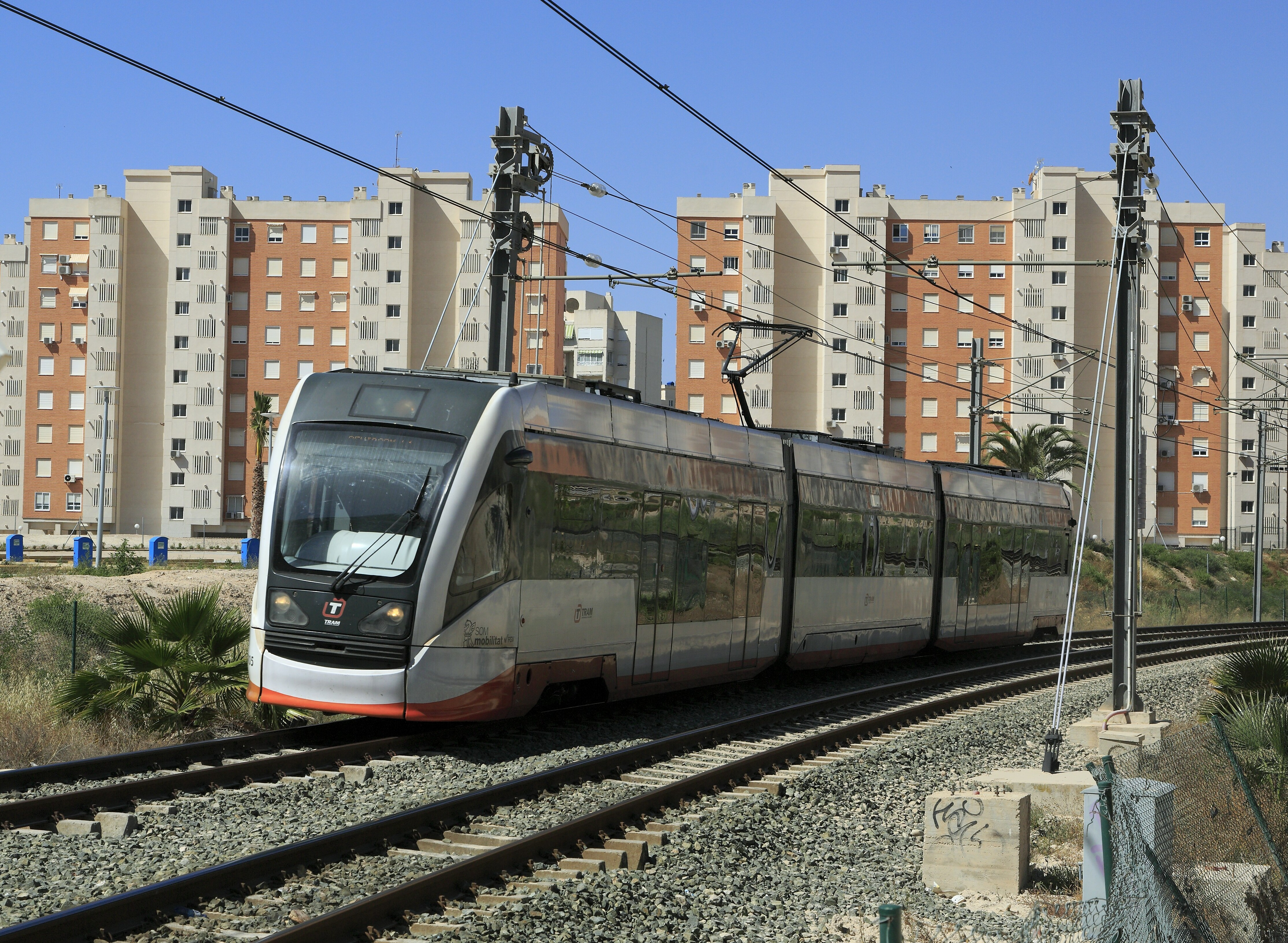
An Alicante 4100 series Citylink near Costa Blanca station, 2017

In April 2003, the Ferrocarrils de la Generalitat Valenciana (FGV) contracted Alstom, the then-owner of the Albuixech factory, for the supply of nine tram-trains for a new metre-gauge tram-train line in Alicante. The units were delivered by Vossloh in 2006 and 2007, and were designated the 4100 series. Each set has a maximum speed of 100 km/h (62 mph) and a capacity for 303 passengers.

FGV ordered a second batch of 6 Citylinks from Stadler in 2017. They were delivered in 2018 and 2019 and entered service in July 2020. They are designated the 5000 series. Unlike the 4100 series, the sets are equipped with a diesel generator in order to operate on the unelectrified line to Dénia, have a maximum speed of 100 km/h (62 mph), and have a total capacity of 303 passengers, 100 seated.

==== León (cancelled) ====
In 2010, FEVE ordered 4 metre-gauge vehicles from Vossloh similar to the ones produced for Mallorca. The vehicles were equipped with a diesel engine for off-wire operation and had a maximum expected service speed of 100 km/h (62 mph). The vehicles were ordered for the León tram, a tram-train service which was to run from León to Cistierna and was expected to open for service in 2013.

León's tramway project itself was significantly set back by political and regulatory causes and as of 2021 construction remains at a virtual standstill, The vehicle contract was cancelled by court in 2017, two of the trams were likely repurposed for use in Mexico while the rest, as of 2025, remain abandoned at the Valencia factory with no deliveries having been made.

==== Mallorca ====
In 2009, Serveis Ferroviaris de Mallorca (SFM) ordered six metre-gauge Citylinks from Vossloh for a planned line reactivation between Manacor and Artà. As approximately 1 km (3,300 ft) of the line in Manacor was to be in the right-of-way of a street, tram-train technology was chosen. These Citylinks are 50% low-floor and use a low boarding height, being the only vehicles on the SFM system to do this, as such requiring low platforms. The reactivation of the line to Artà was suspended in 2011 due to a lack of funds, and the right-of-way was later converted into a cycleway. The vehicles were nonetheless constructed starting in 2009 and delivered in 2010 and 2011 and designated the 91 or 9100 series. Given there were no suitable platforms on the system for the vehicles to use SFM had to put them in storage. In 2012 SFM intended to retrofit provisional platforms at Palma Intermodal, Marratxí, and Inca in order to enable the Citylinks vehicles to operate as rush-hour express service. Such a service was launched in December 2012, but discontinued in July 2014, necessarily putting the trains back in storage.

In 2020, the units were reported to be out-of-service. In May 2021 it was announced that SFM will invest €2,600,000 (Note: €2,400,000 according to some sources) into building low platforms at Sa Pobla, Llubí and Muro stations in order to enable the Citylinks' use on the Inca–Sa Pobla branch with the goal of increasing frequencies on the branch through direct service to Palma. The Citylinks resumed service in May 2022. Though by late 2025 they were returned to storage as the Més per Mallorca party has called for their return to the Inca–Sa Pobla branch to improve frequencies and enable better utilisation of existing stock.

=== United Kingdom ===
==== Sheffield ====
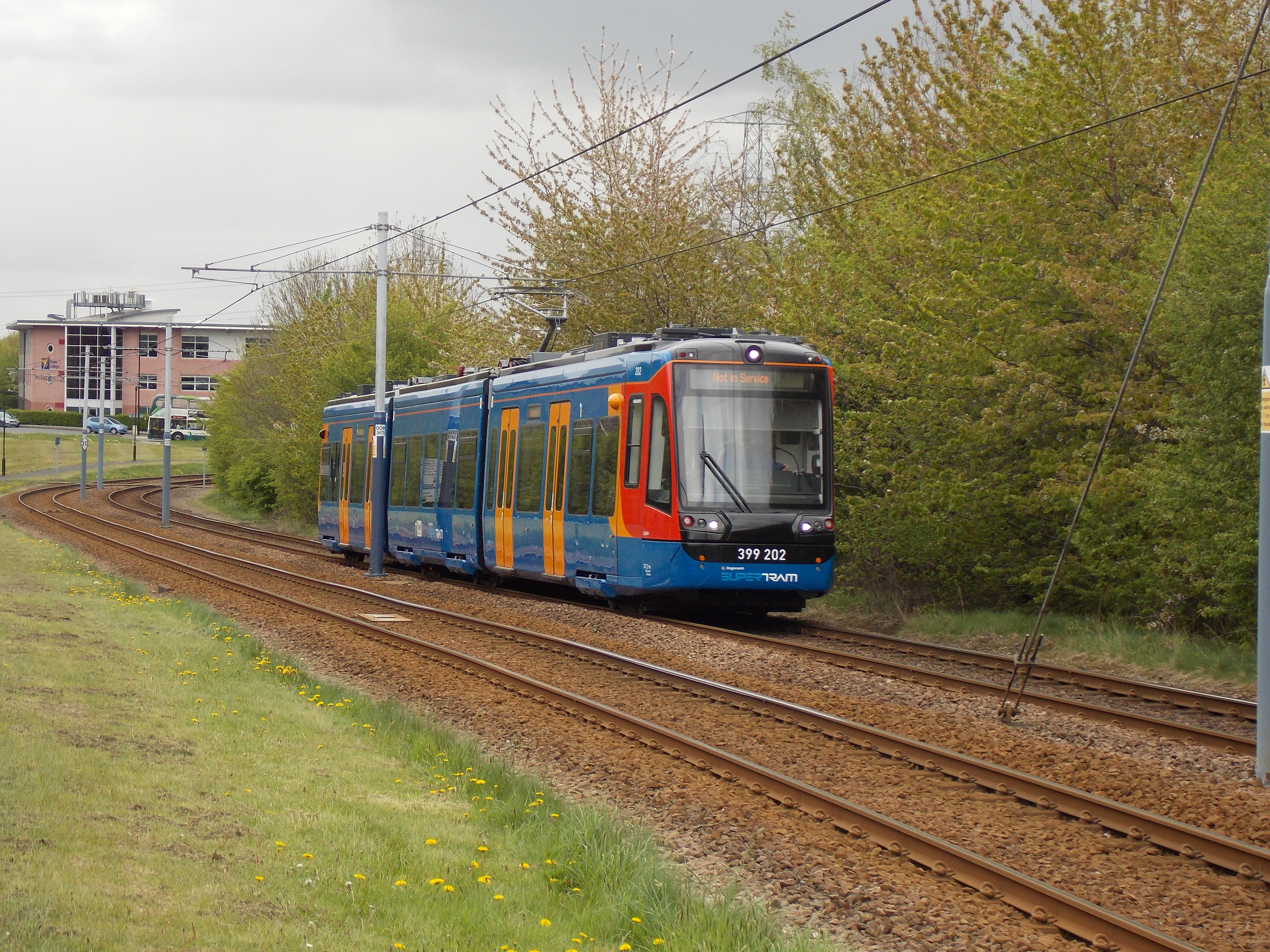
A Sheffield Supertram Citylink on test at Donetsk Way, Sheffield, 2017

In 2008 it was announced by the Department for Transport that Sheffield would be used as the location for the first ever tram-train in the United Kingdom as part of a nationwide pilot scheme. Initially services were planned to be operated along the Penistone line from Sheffield to Huddersfield; this was later revised into a scheme operating along the Dearne Valley line between Sheffield and Parkgate via Rotherham Central.

In June 2013, the South Yorkshire Passenger Transport Executive (SYPTE) placed an order from Vossloh for 7 Citylinks for use on the Sheffield-Rotherham tram-train. Barring their dual-voltage equipment (for 750 V DC and 25 kV 50 Hz AC), the vehicles are considered similar to Karlruhe's NET-2012. Three tram-trains are required to work the service, with three being used to increase the number of services on the existing network and one in maintenance. The first tram-train was scheduled for delivery in September 2015, but the first unit was delivered later, in December 2015. The Citylinks were designated TOPS-class 399.

The first Citylink entered service on the existing network in September 2017, and on the tram-train line to Rotherham in October 2018.

==== South Wales ====
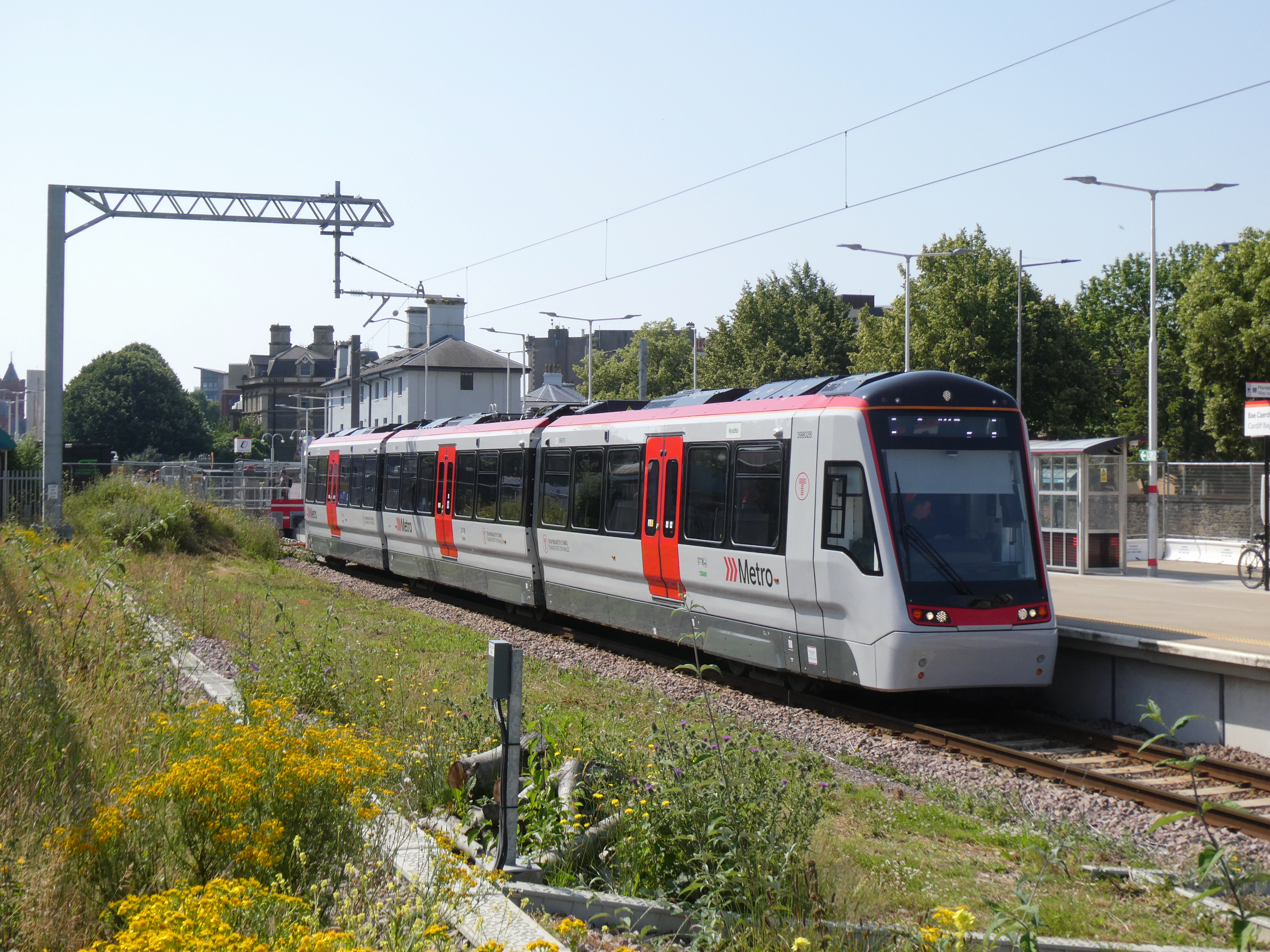
A Transport for Wales Citylink at Cardiff Bay in 2026.

In June 2018, it was announced that for the South Wales Metro, Transport for Wales Rail will purchase 36 3-car Stadler Citylinks. They will operate in train mode north of Cardiff Central whilst switching to battery tram mode on the Butetown branch line. These will serve the Merthyr and Rhondda lines as well as the Cardiff City Line. These vehicles are the first to feature "smart-electrification" which allows Discontinuous electrification with permanently earthed sections around restricted structures. These vehicles will switch to battery mode under bridges and tunnels negating the need for costly reconstruction of over 50 structures on the South Wales Metro. These Citylinks were designated the British Rail Class 398 under the TOPS classification, and the first unit arrived in the UK for testing in May 2022. The first vehicle arrived at Taff's Well Depot in March 2023. The Class 398 entered service in March 2026.

=== United States ===
==== Austin (future) ====
In July 2026, Austin Transit Partnership approved an order of 21 Citylink cars with an option for an additional 19. The vehicles are planned to enter service in 2033 upon the completion of the city's first light rail line.

==== Salt Lake City (future) ====
In October 2024, the Utah Transit Authority approved an order of 20 Citylink cars with an option of up to 60 additional cars to replace its original Siemens SD100/160 cars, making the first time Stadler has sold an electric tram in the United States. This was as Stadler underbid Siemens' S700 at US$6.8 million per vehicle with a price per-vehicle of US$5.5 million. Building Salt Lake considered this a better choice overall due to return contributions to the local economy as the trains will be assembled at Stadler's Salt Lake City plant.

20 of the order's options were exercised in 2025. The trains are expected to be delivered in September 2027.

== See also ==
- Tram-train
- Karlsruhe model
- Stadler Tramlink
- Stadler Tango
- Alstom Citadis Dualis
