= Puebla–Cholula Tourist Train =

Former diesel tram-train service in Puebla-State, Mexico

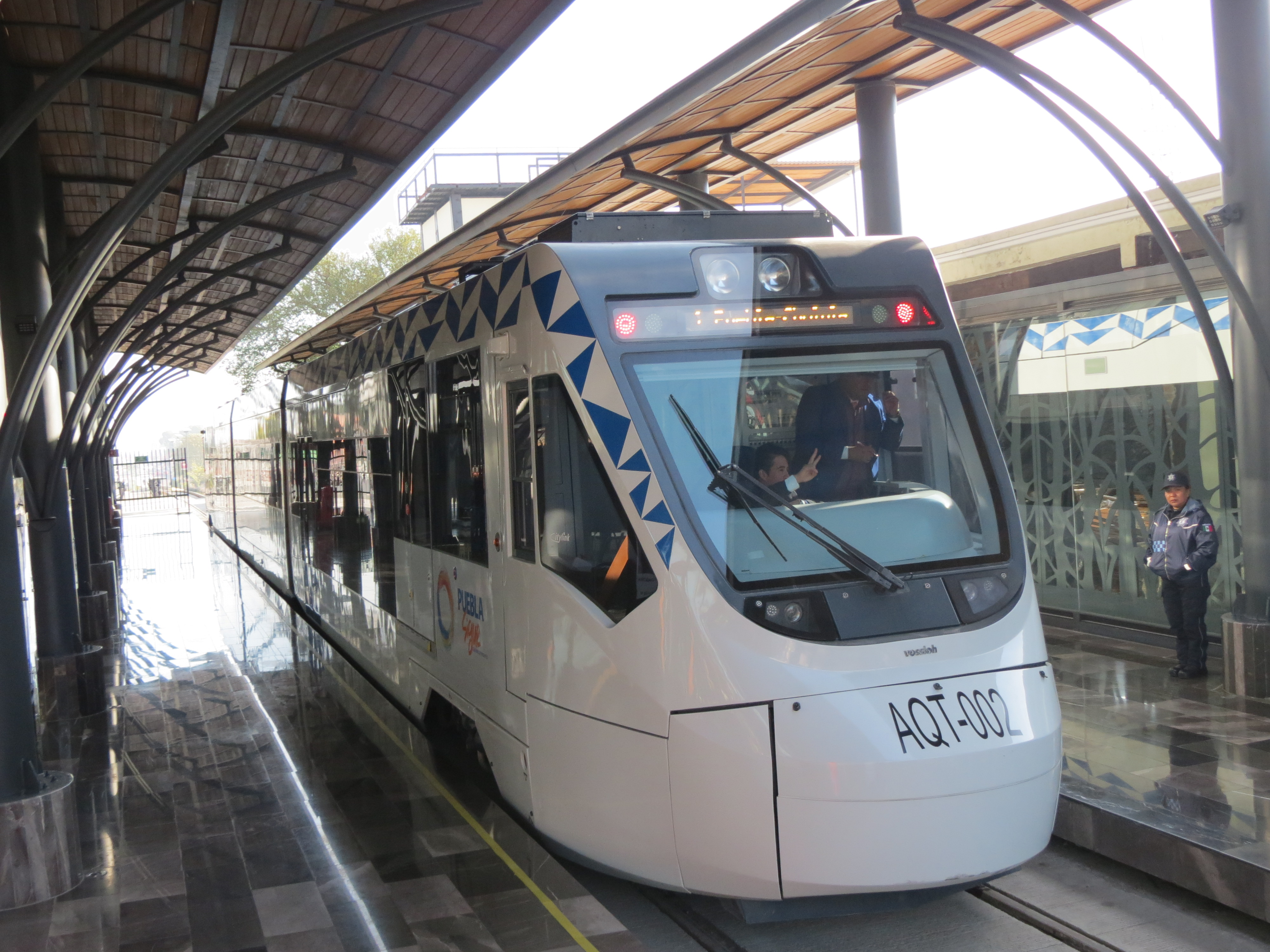
- Puebla-Cholula Tourist Train at Cholula station

Overview
- Service type: Tram-train
- Status: Discontinued
- Locale: Puebla
- First service: 23 January 2017; 9 years ago
- Last service: 31 December 2021; 4 years ago
- Former operator: Government of the State of Puebla
- Ridership: 161,377 (2019)

Route
- Termini: Puebla; Cholula
- Stops: 2
- Distance travelled: 17.4
- Average journey time: 40 minutes

Technical
- Rolling stock: Stadler Citylink
- Track gauge: 1,435 mm (4 ft 8 1/2 in) standard gauge
- Operating speed: 30
Route map

The Puebla–Cholula Tourist Train (Spanish: Tren turístico Puebla–Cholula) was a diesel tram-train service that connected the city centre of Puebla with the tourist zone in Cholula in the Mexican state of Puebla. Operation began in January 2017 and ended in December 2021.

== History ==
The project was announced in July 2015 by Puebla State Governor Rafael Moreno Valle Rosas. Construction began in November 2015 and was completed in early 2017 when it was inaugurated by President Enrique Peña Nieto and Governor Moreno Valle. Initially budgeted to cost 800 million pesos, final project costs totaled 1,113 million pesos.

== Route ==
The 17.4 km (10.8 mi) single-track route largely utilized existing rail rights-of-way to the north and west of the city of Puebla. The route began at the National Railway Museum in Puebla's city centre. The first 2 km (1.2 mi) of the route operated as a tram line without any stops along city streets with mixed vehicle traffic. The remainder of the route utilized a dedicated at-grade right-of-way from Puebla to Cholula Station adjacent to the Cholula Archaeological Zone. An additional two intermediate stops, Mercado Hidalgo Station and Momoxpan Station, were constructed but have not been opened.

== Operations ==
The Puebla-Cholula Tourist Train's rolling stock consisted of two three-car diesel-electric 38 m (125 ft)-long trains supplied by Vossloh. The trains have a capacity of 284 people. Average train speed was 30 km/h and the approximate travel time between Puebla and Cholula was 40 minutes. There were three daily departures from each terminal on weekdays and nine daily departures from each terminal on weekends and holidays.

Operations ended on December 31, 2021 due to a lack of profitability. The rolling stock was transferred to Tren Interoceánico in the states of Veracruz and Oaxaca.
