= Szeged-Hódmezővásárhely Tram-train =

Hungarian Tram-train

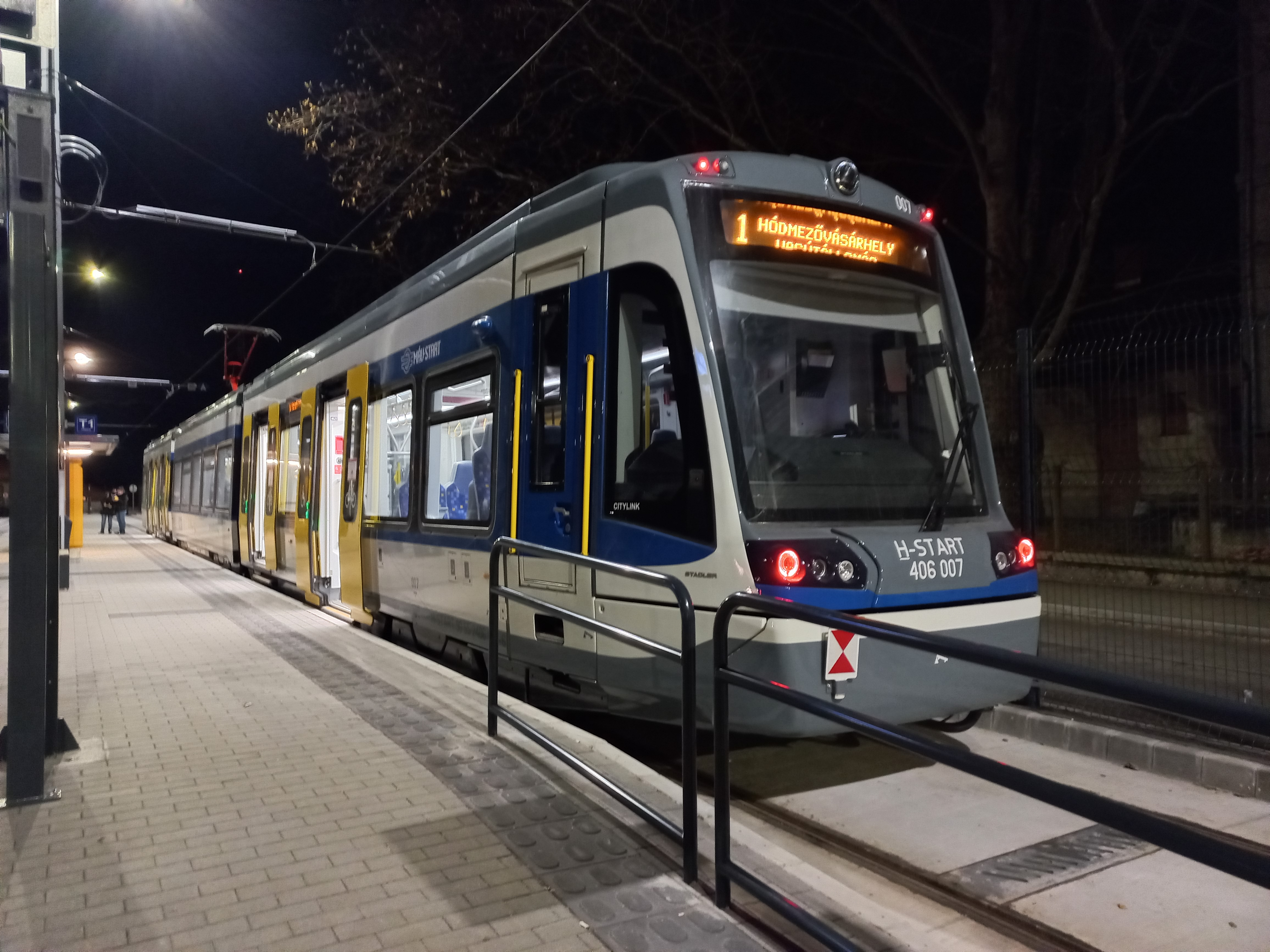

Overview
- Area served: Szeged; Hódmezővásárhely, Hungary
- Transit type: Tram-train
- Line number: 1

Operation
- Began operation: 29 November 2021
- Operator: MÁV Személyszállítási Zrt.

The Szeged-Hódmezővásárhely Tram-train is a tram-train system in Hungary between the cities of Csongrád-Csanád County, Szeged (the county seat) and Hódmezővásárhely (a city with county rights). Construction began on 4 April 2018, and it was inaugurated on 29 November 2021.

== History ==
Many commute between the two cities during the school days, 60% of which by public transport. The cities are connected by regional buses and a train service that runs by the hour. The distance between the two bus stations is 26,2 km (16,2 miles) and the journey takes about 30–37 minutes (depending on the number of stops the bus has to take). Because of the traffic jams caused by the number of vehicles and the number of passengers, most buses are up to 10 minutes late.

There is also a train service between Szeged and Hódmezővásárhely provided by a fleet of diesel trains, however this system is poorly operated as there is only one track available with the trains running on an hourly basis with a maximum speed of 80 km/h (50 mph).

In 2007, a plan was made for the Szeged Transport Ltd. and by 2016 permission for construction was given.

== The project ==
The goal of the project is to create a modern, frequent, easy and fast mean of public transport between the two cities. The system is planned to connect with the old Szeged–Békéscsaba railway, tram line 1 in Szeged and there's also planning of creating a brand new tram system in Hódmezővásárhely the tram-train can connect with.

== Route ==
- Szeged pályaudvar
- Galamb utca
- Bécsi körút
- Aradi vértanúk tere
- Somogyi utca
- Széchenyi tér
- Anna-kút
- Rókusi templom
- Tavasz utca
- Damjanich utca
- Vásárhelyi Pál utca
- Pulz utca
- Rókus vasútállomás
- Algyő
- Hódmezővásárhelyi Népkert
- Strandfürdő
- Hősök tere
- Kossuth tér
- Kálvin János tér
- Hódmezővásárhely vasútállomás

== Fleet ==
In 2017, MÁV-START Zrt. (today MÁV Személyszállítási Zrt. a subsidiary of MÁV for passenger transport) ordered a tender for a fleet of hybrid diesel-electric tram-trains that would run on the system. This ended on February 8, 2017 with Stadler winning with its Stadler Citylink trams. The first vehicle was delivered by Stadler Rail Valencia in January 2021 with the last ones planned to arrive until the end of the year. Finally, the last one, Unit 012, arrived in September 2022. A maintenance depot was constructed at the Szeged-Rendező station.

== Criticism ==
The project received most of the criticism for its budget overruns. In 2017 János Lázár, former mayor of the town of Hódmezővásárhely criticized the National Infrastructure Developing Company (NIF Zrt.) for letting the price tag go up from the 23,5 billion HUF (approx. EUR 64 million) estimated in the feasibility study to 71 billion HUF (approx. EUR 193 million), as of 2017, mostly due to the price increase on the railway line reconstruction that costs 48,5 bln HUF. However, Lázár continued to support the project as the member of the government.
