= Trams in Zwickau =

Tram system in Zwickau, Saxony, Germany

Zwickau tramway network
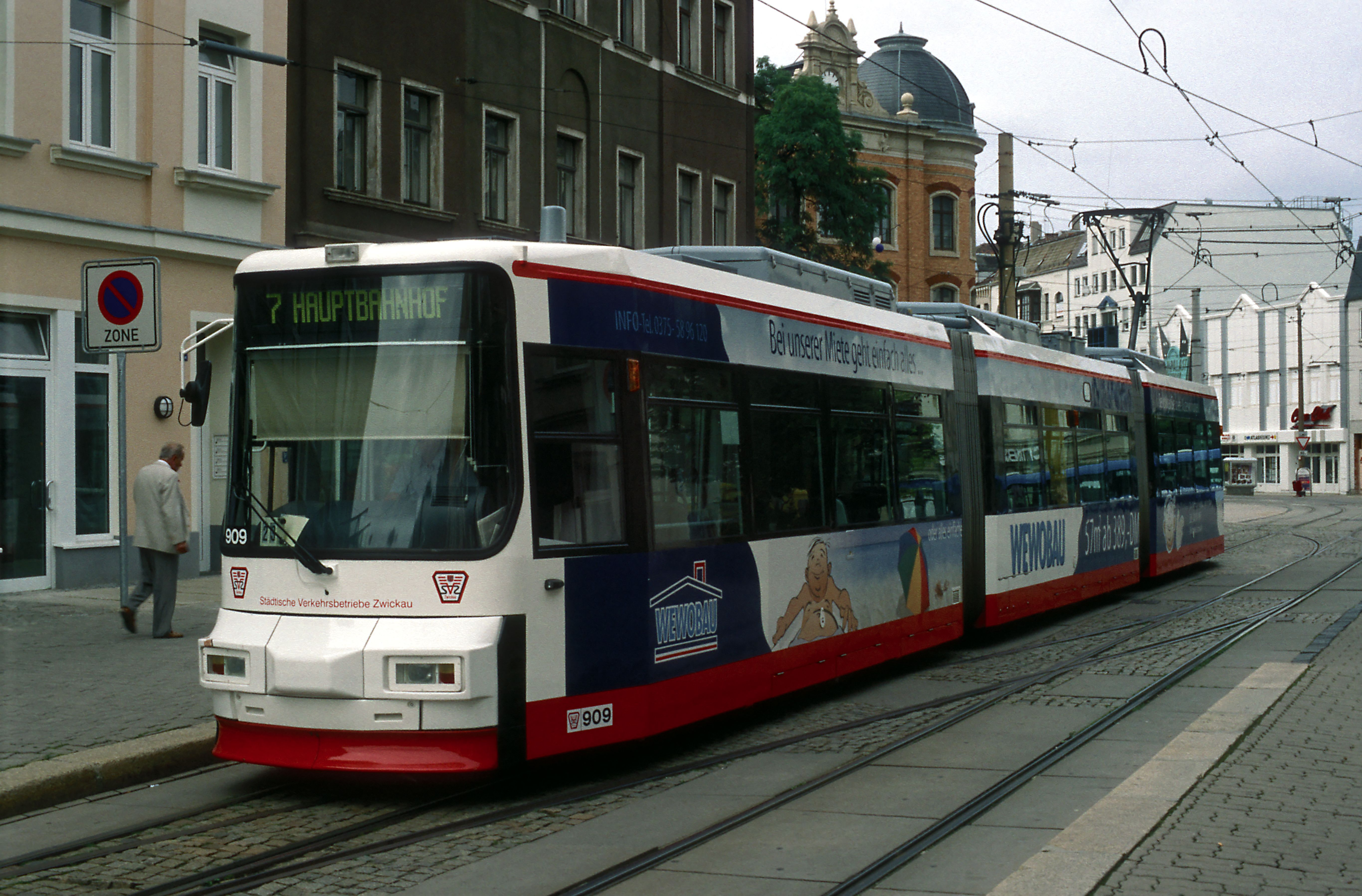
- A GT6M tram in Zwickau

Operation
- Locale: Zwickau, Saxony, Germany
- Open: 6 May 1894
- Status: Operational
- Lines: 2
- Operators: Städtische Verkehrsbetriebe Zwickau (SVZ); (since 1991)

Infrastructure
- Track gauge: 1,000 mm (3 ft 3 3/8 in)
- Propulsion system: Electricity
- Electrification: 600 V DC
- Stock: 19 KT4D; 12 GT6N

Statistics
- Route length: 18.5 km (11.5 mi)
- Stops: 71
Overview
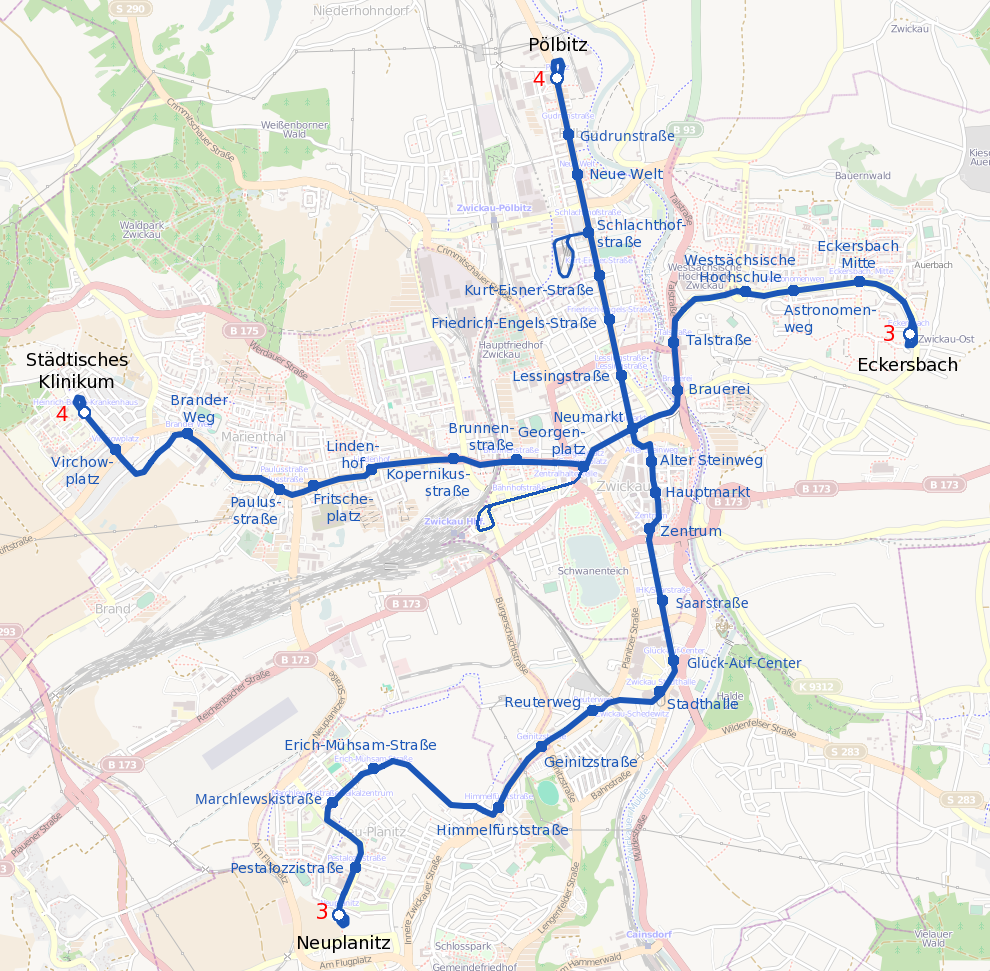
- Website: http://www.nahverkehr-zwickau.de/ Städtische Verkehrsbetriebe Zwickau (in German)

The Zwickau tramway network (German: Straßenbahnnetz Zwickau) is a network of tramways forming part of the public transport system in Zwickau, a city in the federal state of Saxony, Germany.

Opened in 1894, the network has been operated since 1991 by Städtische Verkehrsbetriebe Zwickau (SVZ), and is integrated in the Verkehrsverbund Mittelsachsen (VMS).

Between Stadhalle and Zwickau Zentrum stations, Die Länderbahn operates mainline diesel services alongside trams, sharing two intermediate stations. This concept has been dubbed the "Zwickau Model".

== Lines ==
As of 2024, the network had the following two lines:

Line	Route	Length	Stops
3	Eckersbach – Neumarkt (Leipziger Straße) – Hauptmarkt – Stadthalle – Neuplanitz	10.1 km	21
4	Pölbitz – Neumarkt (Bosestraße) – Georgenplatz – Paulusstraße – Klinikum	8.1 km	17

This network was implemented at the timetable change on 15 December 2019, when lines 5 and 7 were suspended. The reason for this is the poor condition of the track on the tram line to the railway station, which is closed until further notice. This route is expected to be returned to operation in 2029 in connection with the planned tram route between Werdauer Straße and Bahnhofstraße. The bus line 10 serves as a replacement, running every 10 minutes.

== Rolling stock ==
As of 2024, Zwickau operates a fleet of 19 KT4D and 12 low-floor GT6M trams.

The KT4D trams were originally built from 1983 to 1990 and modernised in 1992-1996 and again from 2001, when they received new chopper control systems. They are used singly on line 4 and in sets of two coupled trams on line 3.

The GT6M are three-section low-floor trams built in 1993 and numbered 901-912.

In 2019 a procurement project for new trams was launched jointly with tram operators in Leipzig and Görlitz. A contract was signed in December 2021 with LEIWAG (a consortium of HeiterBlick and Kiepe Electric) and Zwickau will receive six new 30 m long trams. However, the operators in Görlitz and Zwickau cancelled this order because of supplier delays, cost escalations and uncertain delivery dates. In 2026, Stadler was awarded the contract for new trams.

In 2026, the operators in Görlitz and Zwickau jointly ordered 14 Stadler TINA trams with eight to operate in Gorlitz and six in Zwickau. The low-floor, single-ended trams will each be 50 metres (160 ft) long, and will be built at Stadler's plant in Poland. The trams for both cities will be identical in design.

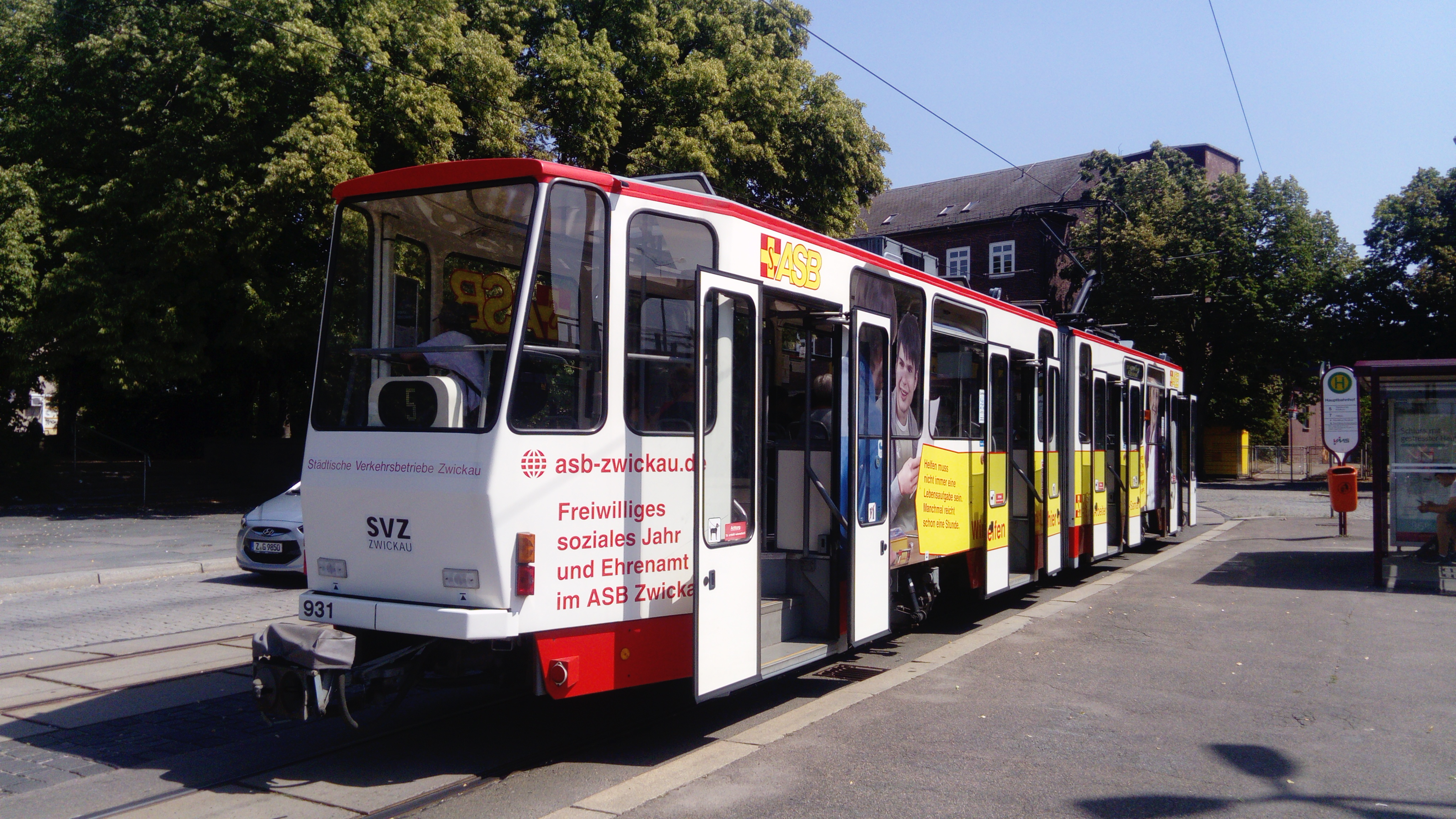
A Tatra KT4D tram at Zwickau Hbf in July 2019

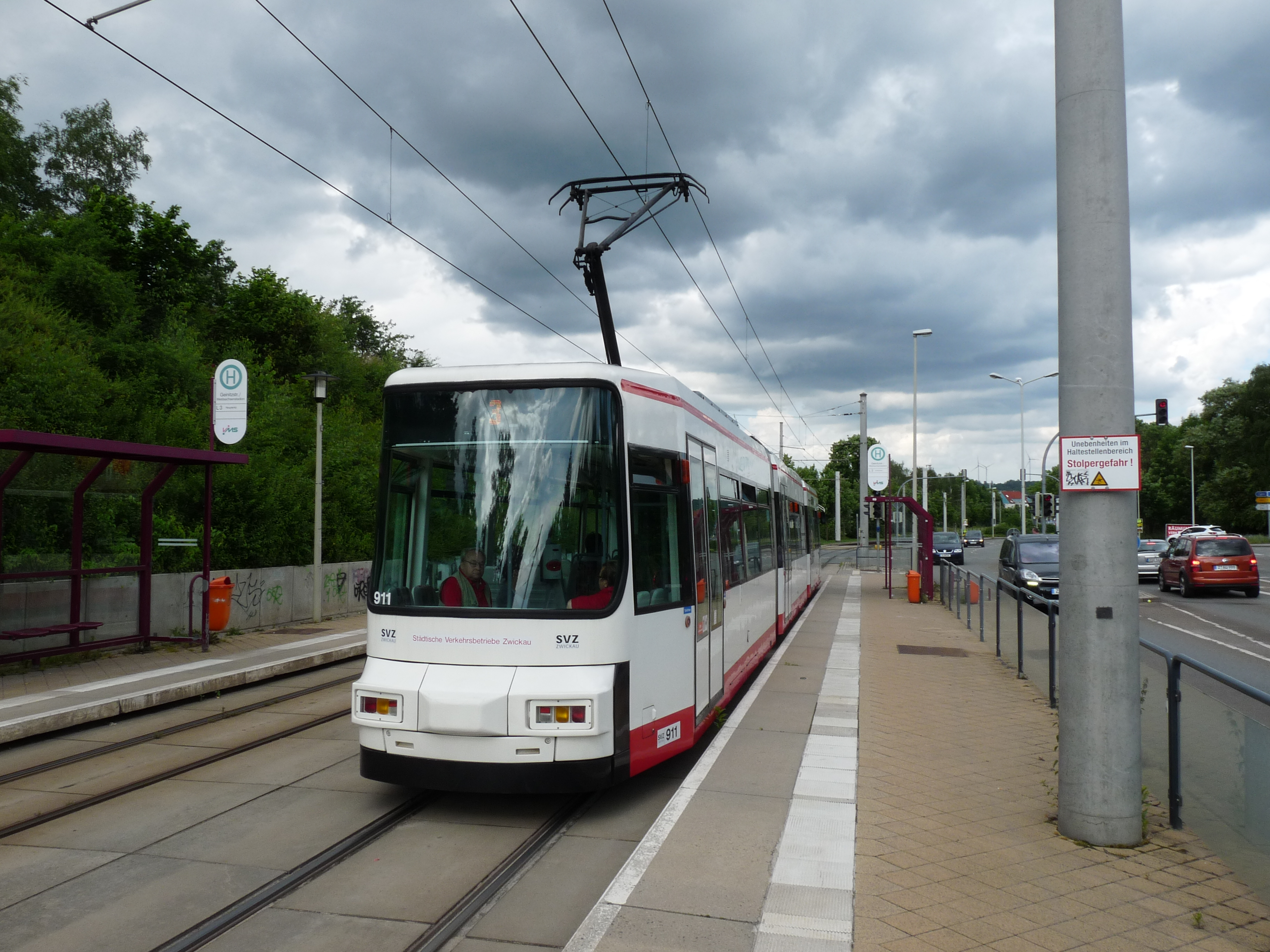
Rear end of a GT6M tram in June 2016

== See also ==
- List of town tramway systems in Germany
- Trams in Germany

== Bibliography ==
- Bauer, Gerhard; Kuschinski, Norbert (1993). Die Straßenbahnen in Ostdeutschland [The Tramways in East Germany]. Vol. Band 1: Sachsen [Volume 1: Saxony]. Aachen, Germany: Schweers + Wall. ISBN 3921679796.
- Schwandl, Robert (2012). Schwandl's Tram Atlas Deutschland (in German and English) (3rd ed.). Berlin: Robert Schwandl Verlag. p. 142. ISBN 9783936573336.
