= Skolebakken railway halt =

Railway halt in Aarhus, Denmark

Skolebakken
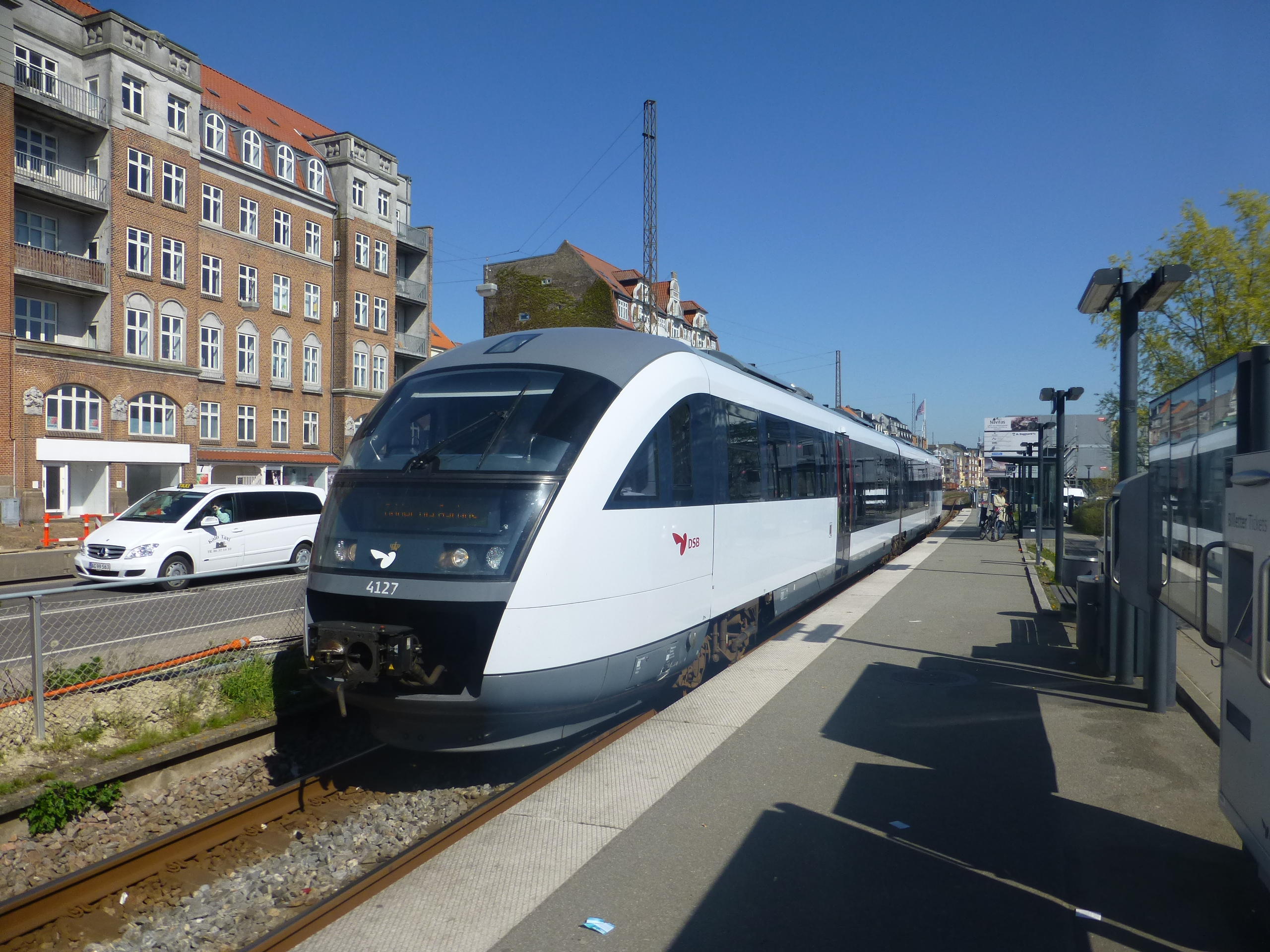
- Skolebakken railway halt in 2014

General information
- Location: Skolebakken; 8000 Aarhus C Aarhus Municipality; Denmark
- Coordinates: 56°9′24.56″N 10°12′46.6″E
- Elevation: 4.1 metres (13 ft)
- Owner: Aarhus Letbane
- Operator: Aarhus Letbane
- Line: Grenaa Line
- Platforms: 1
- Tracks: 2

History
- Rebuilt: 2017
Location

Skolebakken railway halt is a railway halt serving the central part of the city of Aarhus in Jutland, Denmark. The station is located on the Grenaa Line between Aarhus and Grenaa. In 2016, the station was temporarily closed along with the Grenaa Line while it's being reconstructed to form part of the Aarhus light rail system. It reopened as such in 2017, and reopened for trams to Grenaa in 2019.

== See also ==
- List of railway stations in Denmark

Preceding station	Aarhus Letbane	Following station
Dokk1 towards Odder or Mårslet	Line 1	Østbanetorvet towards Grenaa or Hornslet
Dokk1 towards Odder	Line 2	Nørreport towards Lisbjergskolen or Lystrup
