= Dokk1 station =

Light railway stop in Aarhus, Denmark

Dokk1
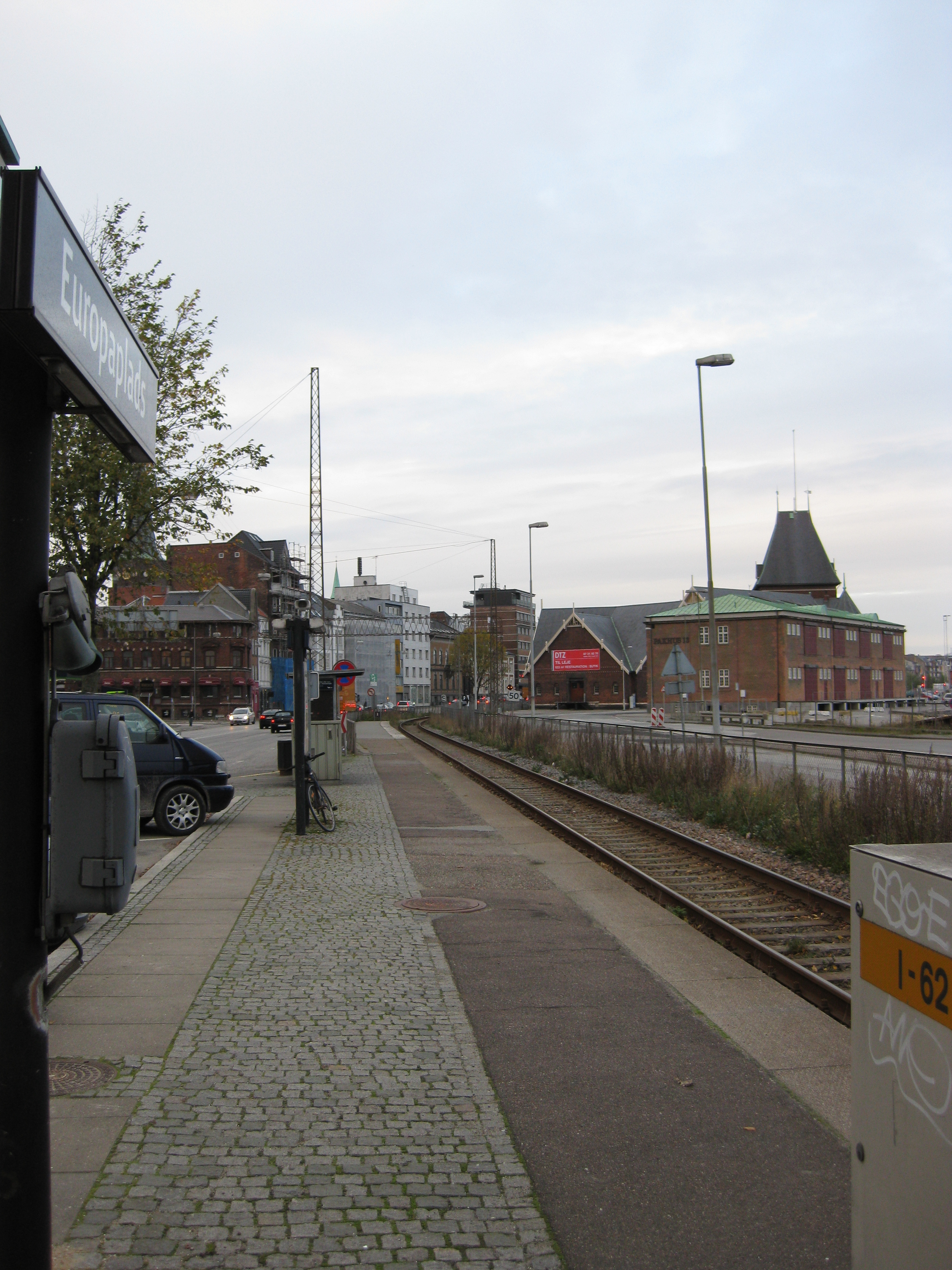
- Europaplads railway halt in 2010

General information
- Location: Europaplads; 8000 Aarhus C Denmark
- Coordinates: 56°9′13.43″N 10°12′47.12″E
- System: railway halt
- Line: Aarhus Letbane
- Platforms: 1
- Tracks: 2

History
- Rebuilt: 2017
Location
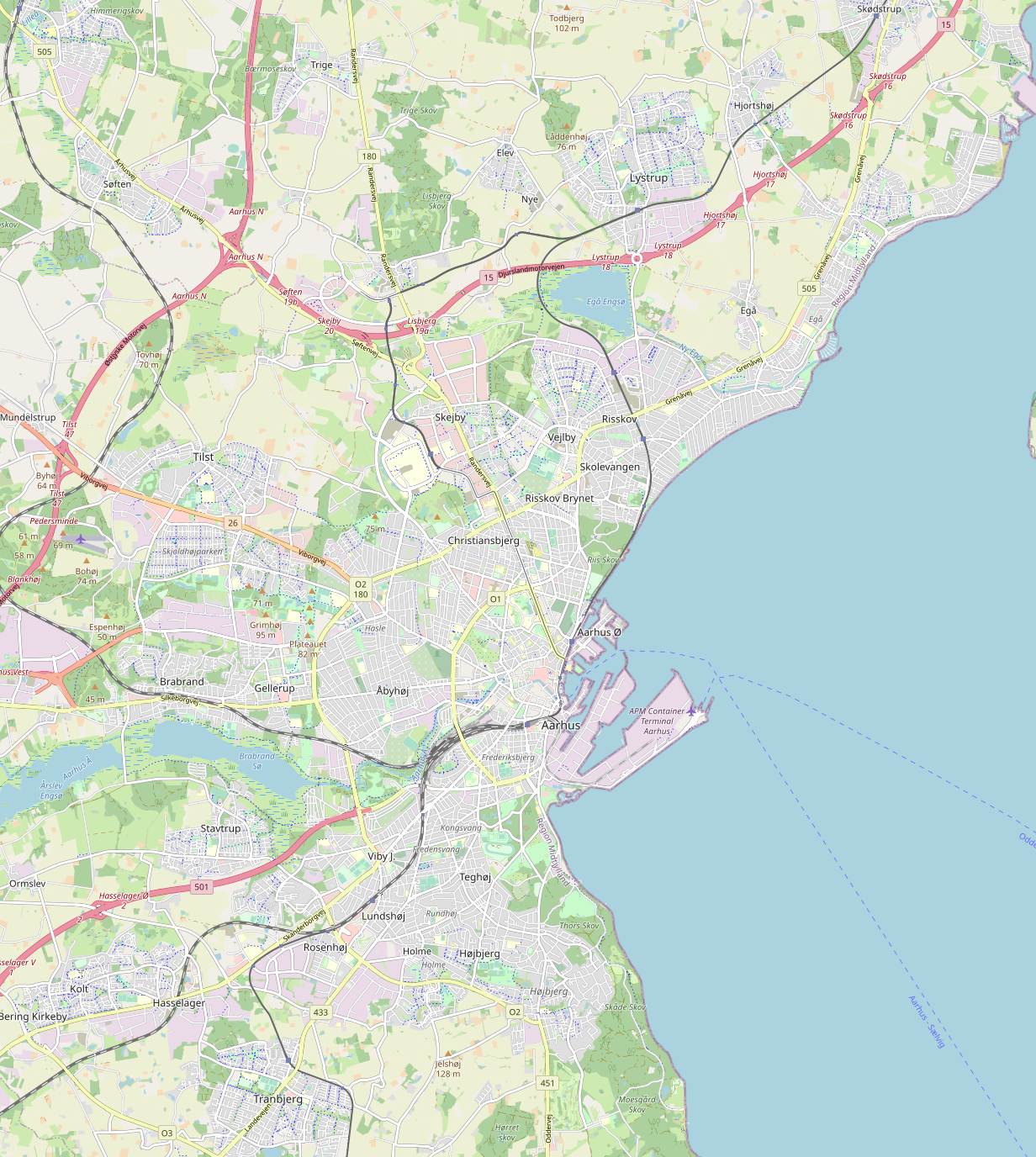
- Location within Aarhus Location within Central Denmark Region Location within Denmark

Dokk1 station is a tram stop serving the central part of the city of Aarhus in Jutland, Denmark. The station is located on the Aarhus light rail, on the Grenaa Line between Aarhus and Grenaa. The station was called Europaplads until it was temporarily closed in 2016 to 2017, then renamed to Dokk1 station, and redefined to a tram stop, a part of the Aarhus light rail system. It is named after the Dokk1 culture centre.

Preceding station	Aarhus Letbane	Following station
Aarhus Central towards Odder or Mårslet	Line 1	Skolebakken towards Grenaa or Hornslet
Aarhus Central towards Odder	Line 2	Skolebakken towards Lisbjergskolen or Lystrup
