= Skødstrup railway station =

Railway station in Skødstrup, Denmark

Skødstrup
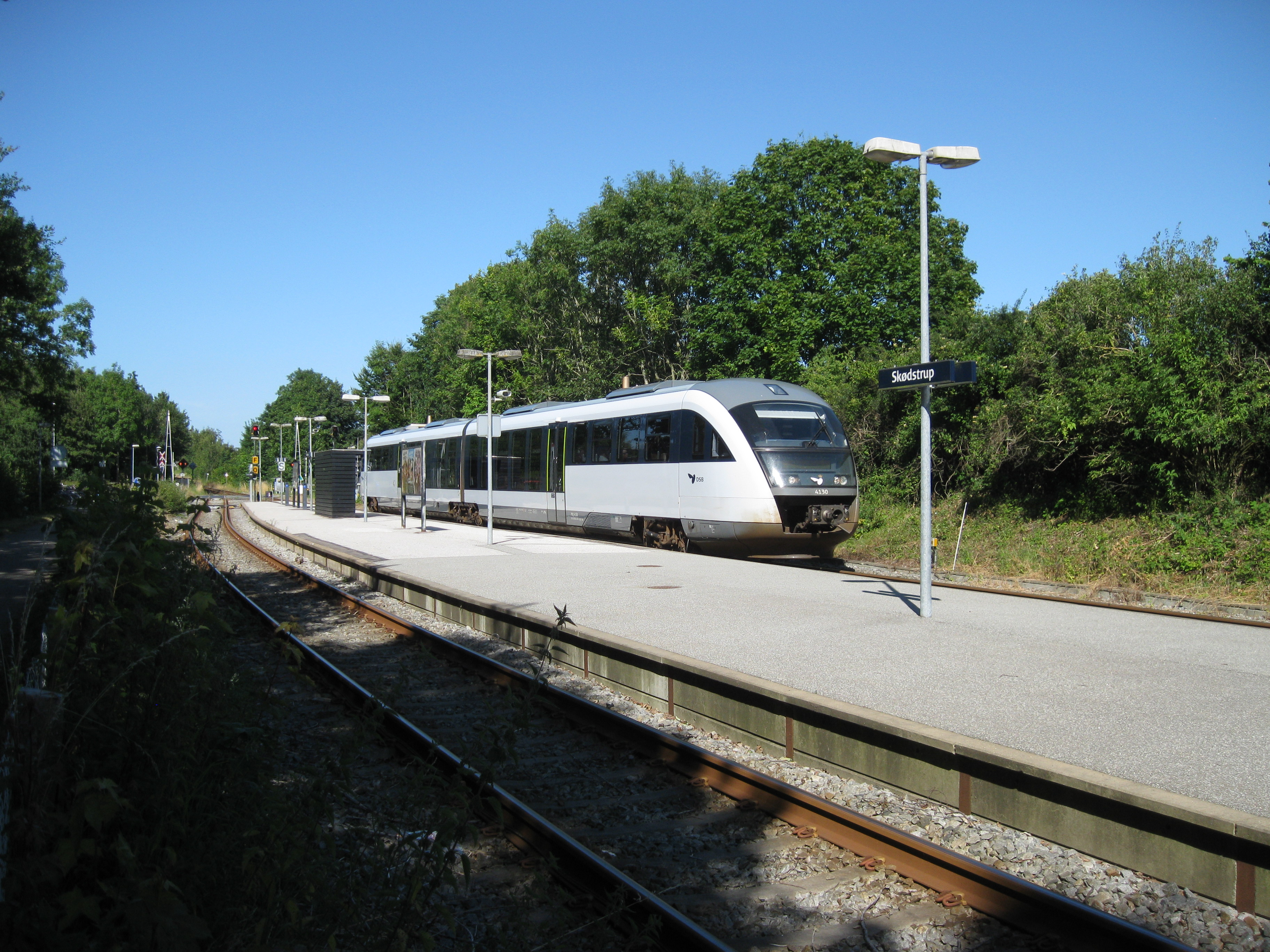
- Skødstrup station in 2012

General information
- Location: Stationsstien; 8541 Skødstrup; Aarhus Municipality; Denmark
- Coordinates: 56°15′43″N 10°18′12″E
- Elevation: 46.6 metres (153 ft)
- Owner: Banedanmark
- Operator: Aarhus Letbane
- Line: Grenaa Line
- Platforms: 1
- Tracks: 2

History
- Opened: 1 May 1878

Services
Preceding station	Aarhus Letbane	Following station
Hjortshøj towards Odder or Mårslet	Line 1	Løgten towards Grenaa or Hornslet
Location

Skødstrup station is a railway station serving the railway town and suburb of Skødstrup north of Aarhus on the peninsula of Djursland in Jutland, Denmark.

The station is located on the Grenaa railway line between Aarhus and Grenaa. It opened in 1878, shortly after the opening of the Aarhus-Ryomgård section of the railway line. Since 2019, the station has been served by the Aarhus light rail system, a tram-train network combining tram lines in the city of Aarhus with operation on railway lines in the surrounding countryside.

== History ==
The station opened on 1 May 1878, one year after the railway company Østjyske Jernbane (ØJJ) opened a branch line from Aarhus to Ryomgård on the Randers-Ryomgaard-Grenaa Line from Randers to Grenaa. Just a few years later the trains starting running directly between Grenaa and Aarhus, with the Ryomgård-Randers section being reduced to a branch line used mostly for rail freight transport until it was closed altogether on 2 May 1971.

From 2016 to 2019, the station was temporarily closed along with the Grenaa railway line while it was being reconstructed and electrified to form part of the Aarhus light rail system, a tram-train network combining tram lines in the city of Aarhus with operation on railway lines in the surrounding countryside. Since 2019, the station has been served by Line L1 of the Aarhus light rail network, operated by the multinational transportation company Keolis.

== Architecture ==
In 1901, a waiting building was constructed, designed by the Danish architect Thomas Arboe. It was torn down in 1969.

== See also ==
- List of railway stations in Denmark
