= Østbanetorvet railway station =

Railway station in Aarhus Municipality, Denmark

Østbanetorvet
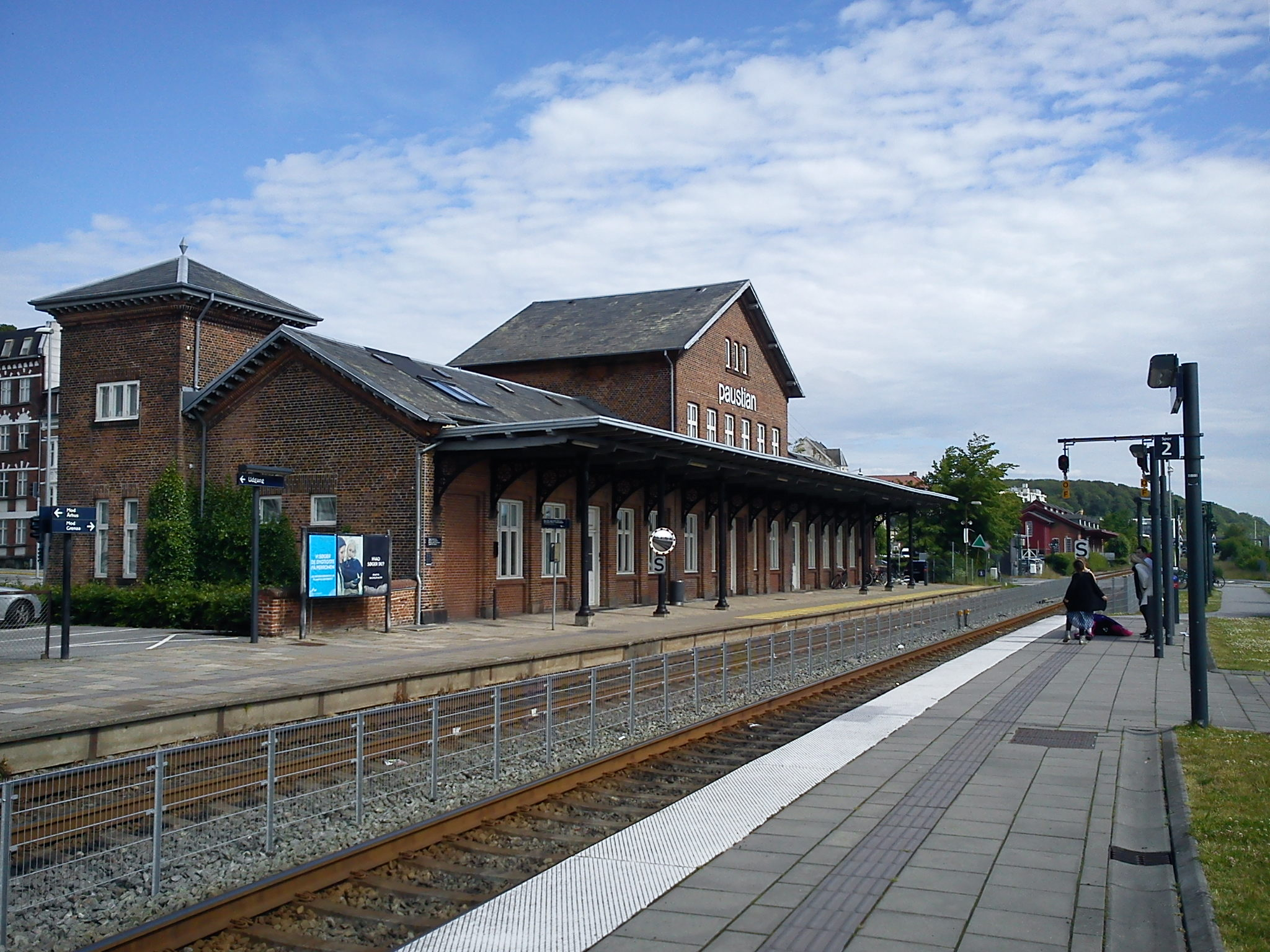
- Østbanetorvet railway station in 2015

General information
- Location: Skovvejen 2; 8000 Aarhus C Aarhus Municipality; Denmark
- Coordinates: 56°9′48″N 10°13′0″E
- Elevation: 3.3 metres (11 ft)
- Owner: Banedanmark
- Operator: Keolis
- Platforms: 2
- Tracks: 2

Construction
- Architect: Niels Peder Christian Holsøe

History
- Opened: 1877
Location

Østbanetorvet station is a railway station serving the central part of the city of Aarhus in Jutland, Denmark. Until 1983 it was known as the East Station (Danish: Østbanegården) or Aarhus East (Danish: Århus Ø).

The station opened in 1877 as the southern terminus of the Grenaa railway line between Aarhus and Grenaa. From 1933, however, all trains were continued from the station via a connecting track along the harbour to Aarhus Central Station. Since 2019, the station has been served by the Aarhus light rail system, a tram-train network combining tram lines in the city of Aarhus with operation on railway lines in the surrounding countryside.

The tracks at the station also handle freight trains to Grenaa, and will continue to do so after being converted into a lightrail station for the public.

== History ==
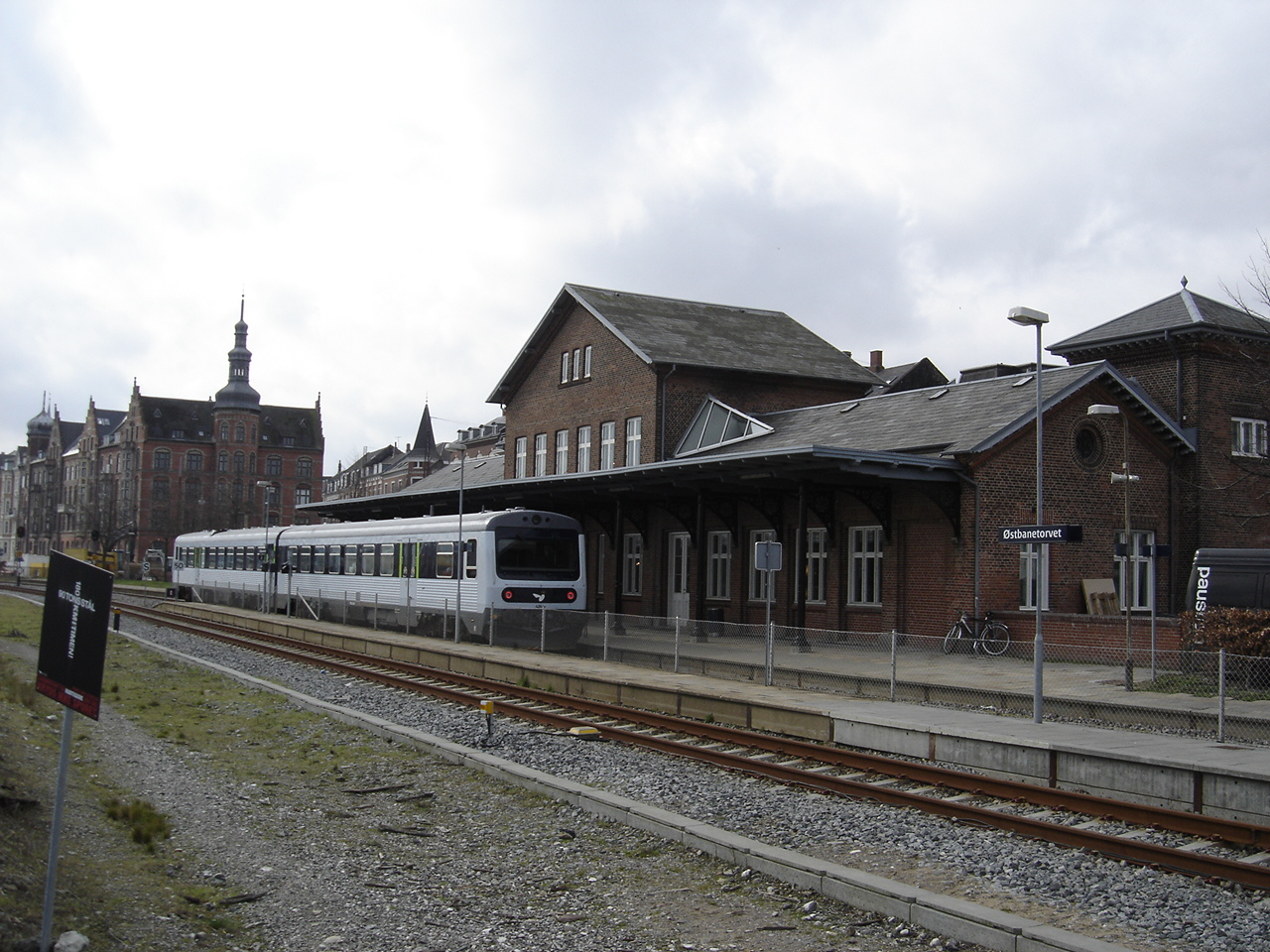
Østbanetorvet station in 2008.

The station opened on 1 December 1877 as the East Station (Danish: Østbanegården or Aarhus East (Danish: Århus Ø), the southern terminus of a 29 km (18 mi) new branch line from Aarhus to Ryomgård run by the railway company Østjyske Jernbane (ØJJ). In Ryomgård the line connected to the Randers–Ryomgaard–Grenaa Line from Randers to Grenaa. Just a few years later, however, the trains started running directly between Aarhus and Grenaa, with the Ryomgård-Randers section being reduced to a branch line. Both lines were taken over by the Danish State Railways (DSB) in 1885.

From 1933, all trains were continued from the station via a connecting track along the harbour to Aarhus Central Station.

From 2016 to 2019, the station was temporarily closed along with the Grenaa railway line while it was being reconstructed and electrified to form part of the Aarhus light rail system, a tram-train network combining tram lines in the city of Aarhus with operation on railway lines in the surrounding countryside. Since 2019, the station has been served by Line L1 of the Aarhus light rail network, operated by the multinational transportation company Keolis.

== Architecture ==
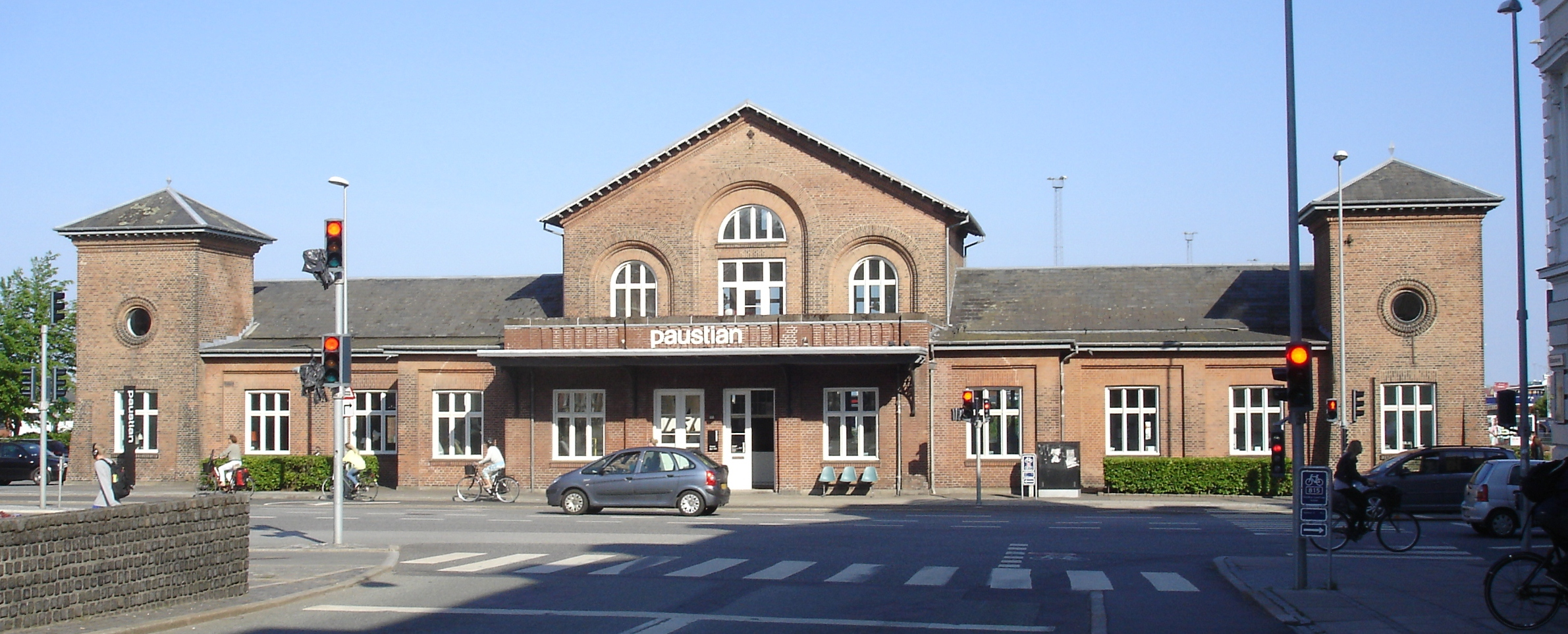
Street facade of the station building in 2013

.

The station building is designed by Danish architect Niels Peder Christian Holsøe who five years previously had used the same designs for the construction of Faaborg station on the island of Funen. Since 2000 the station building has housed a furniture store.

== See also ==
- List of railway stations in Denmark

Preceding station	Aarhus Letbane	Following station
Skolebakken towards Odder or Mårslet	Line 1	Risskov Strandpark towards Grenaa or Hornslet
