= Torsøvej railway station =

Railway station in Aarhus, Denmark

Torsøvej
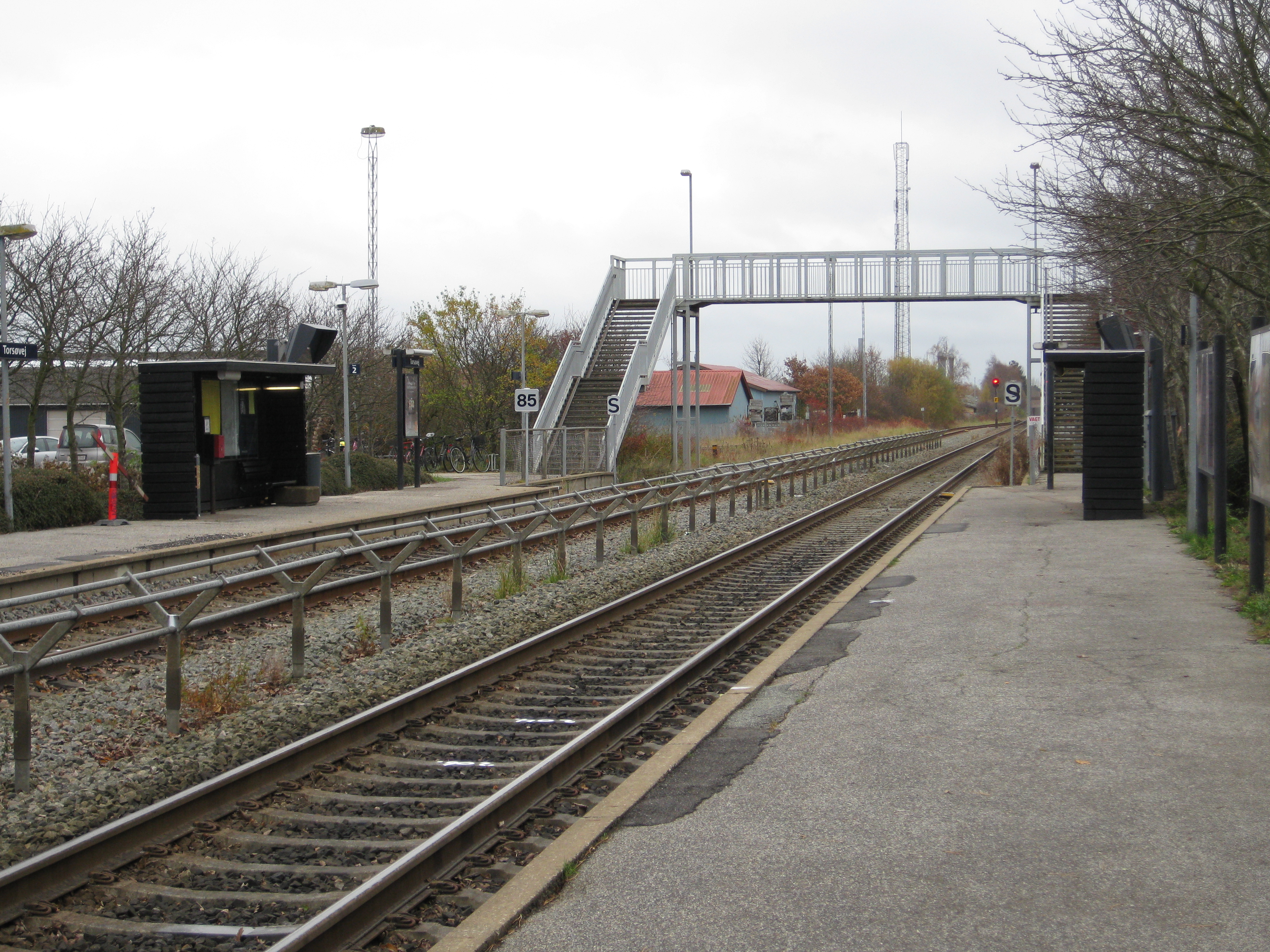
- Torsøvej railway station in 2010

General information
- Location: Torsøvej; 8240 Risskov; Aarhus Municipality; Denmark
- Coordinates: 56°12′19″N 10°13′43″E
- Elevation: 10.9 metres (36 ft)
- Owner: Banedanmark
- Operator: Keolis
- Line: Grenaa Line
- Platforms: 2
- Tracks: 2

Services
Preceding station	Aarhus Letbane	Following station
Vestre Strandallé towards Odder or Mårslet	Line 1	Lystrup towards Grenaa or Hornslet
Location

Torsøvej station is a railway station serving the district of Risskov in the northern part of the city of Aarhus in Jutland, Denmark. The station is located on the Grenaa railway line between Aarhus and Grenaa. Since 2019, the station has been served by the Aarhus light rail system, a tram-train network combining tram lines in the city of Aarhus with operation on railway lines in the surrounding countryside.

== See also ==
- List of railway stations in Denmark
