= Løgten =

Coordinates: 56.1643°N 10.1857°E

- Town
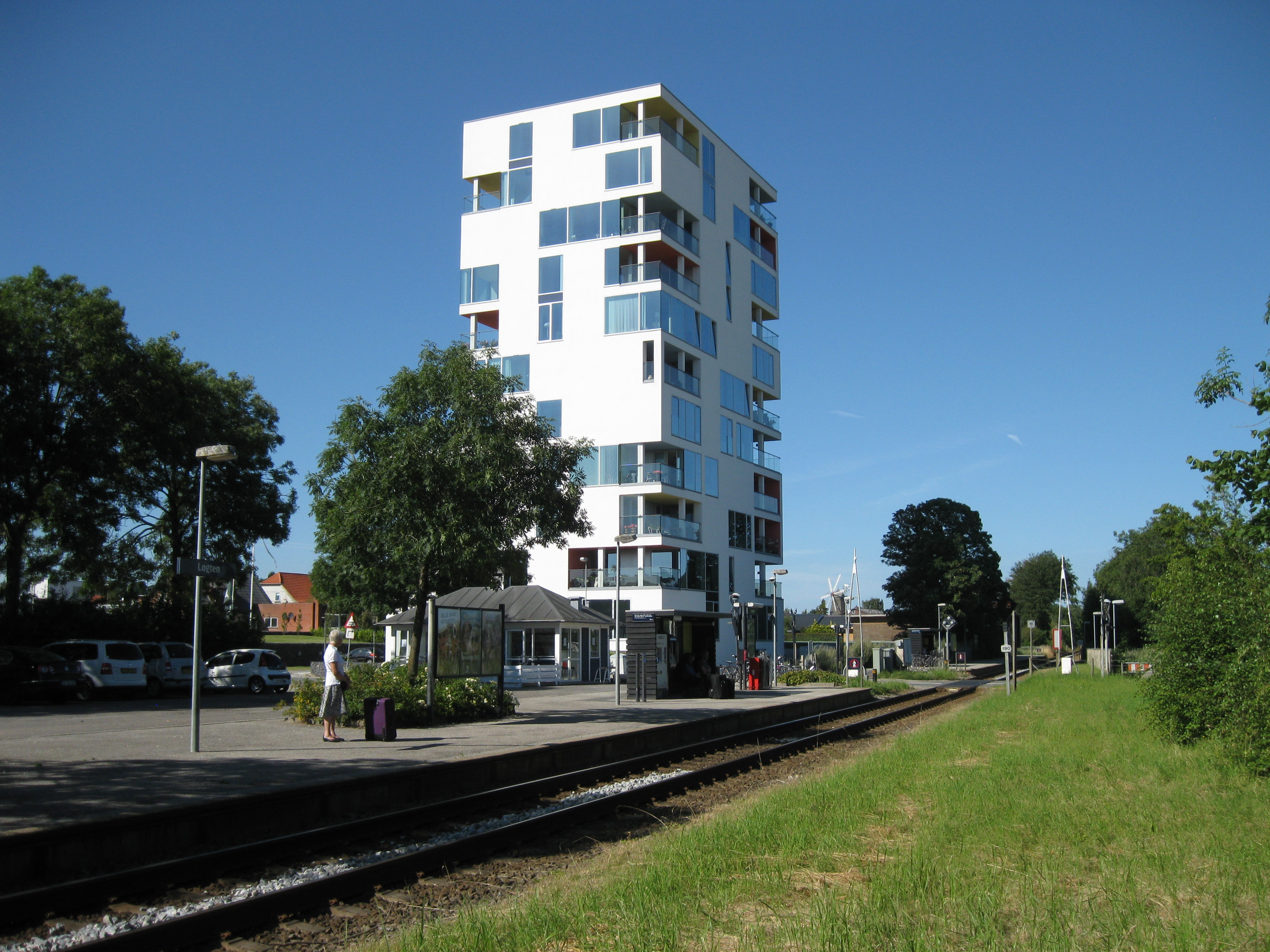
- Løgten local train station

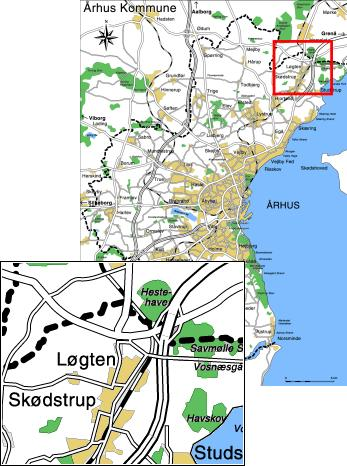
- Location of Løgten in Aarhus Municipality
- Country: Kingdom of Denmark
- Regions of Denmark: Central Denmark Region
- Municipality: Aarhus Municipality
- Parish: Skødstrup Sogn

Area
  - Urban: 3.8 km^{2} (1.5 sq mi)

Population (2026)
  - Urban: 8,623
  - Urban density: 2,300/km^{2} (5,900/sq mi)
  - Gender: 4,213 males and 4,410 females
- Time zone: UTC+1 (CET)
  - Summer (DST): UTC+2 (CEST)
- Postal code: DK-8541 Skødstrup

Løgten is a town in Aarhus Municipality, Central Denmark Region in Denmark. Løgten is close to the motorway Djurslandsmotorvejen between Skødstrup and Lisbjerg, the railway between Aarhus and Randers and is a station on the light rail system Aarhus Letbane. Løgten had a population of 8,623 (1 January 2026).
