= Vestre Strandallé railway halt =

Railway halt in Aarhus, Denmark

Vestre Strandallé
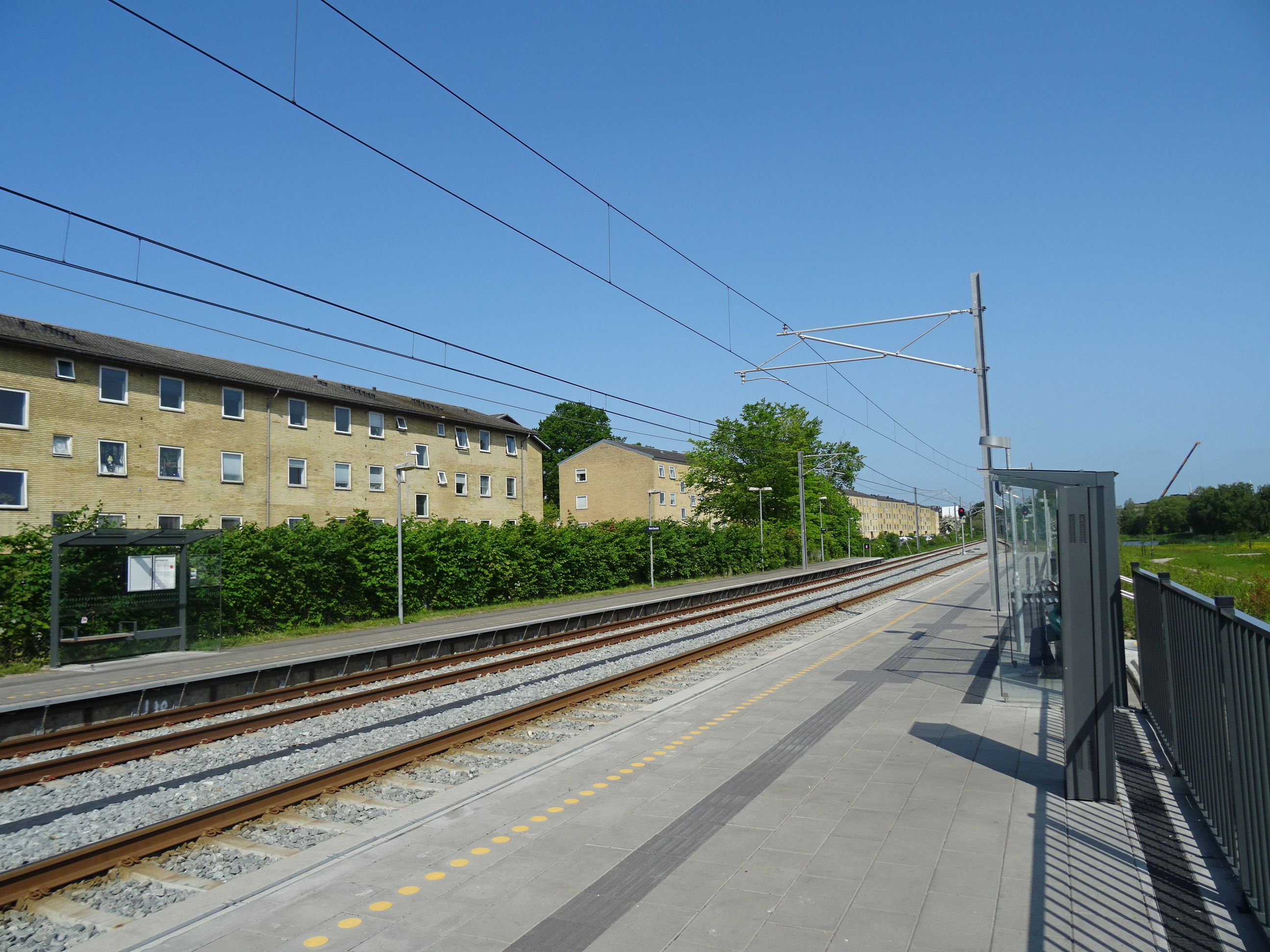
- Vestre Strandallé railway halt in 2023

General information
- Location: Vestre Strandallé; 8240 Risskov; Aarhus Municipality; Denmark
- Coordinates: 56°11′39″N 10°14′14.5″E
- Elevation: 4.9 metres (16 ft)
- Owner: Aarhus Letbane
- Operator: Aarhus Letbane
- Line: Grenaa Line
- Platforms: 1
- Tracks: 1

Services
Preceding station	Aarhus Letbane	Following station
Risskov Strandpark towards Odder or Mårslet	Line 1	Torsøvej towards Grenaa or Hornslet
Location

Vestre Strandallé railway halt is a railway halt serving the district of Risskov in the northern part of the city of Aarhus in Jutland, Denmark. The station is located on the Grenaa railway line between Aarhus and Grenaa. Since 2019, the station has been served by the Aarhus light rail system, a tram-train network combining tram lines in the city of Aarhus with operation on railway lines in the surrounding countryside.

== See also ==
- List of railway stations in Denmark
- Rail transport in Denmark
