= Hovmarken railway halt =

Railway halt in East Jutland, Denmark

Hovmarken
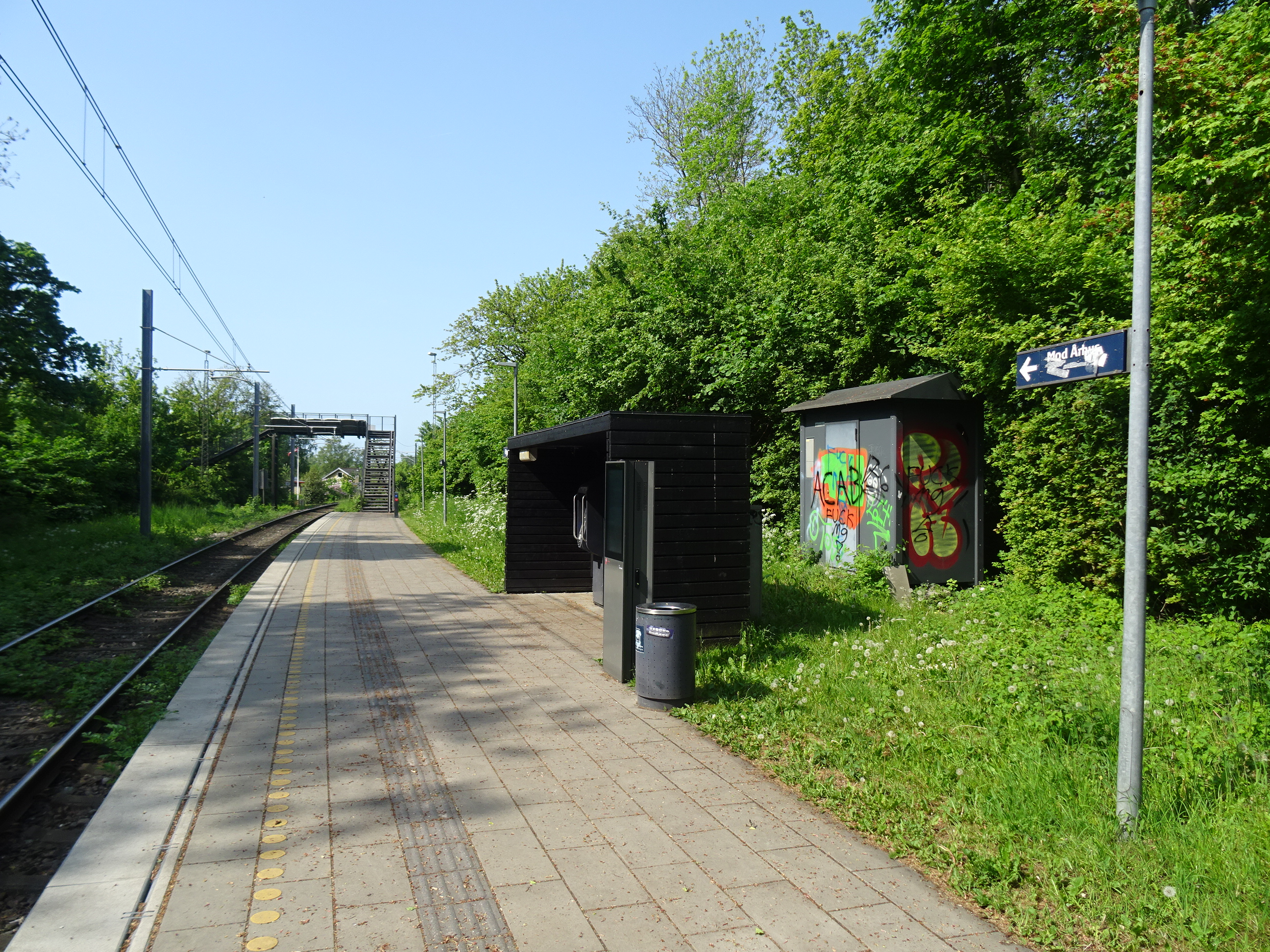
- Hovmarken railway halt in 2023

General information
- Location: Hovmarken; 8520 Lystrup; Aarhus Municipality; Denmark
- Coordinates: 56°14′3.05″N 10°15′20.03″E
- Elevation: 28.0 metres (91.9 ft)
- System: railway halt
- Line: Grenaa Line
- Platforms: 1
- Tracks: 1

History
- Closed: 2024
Location
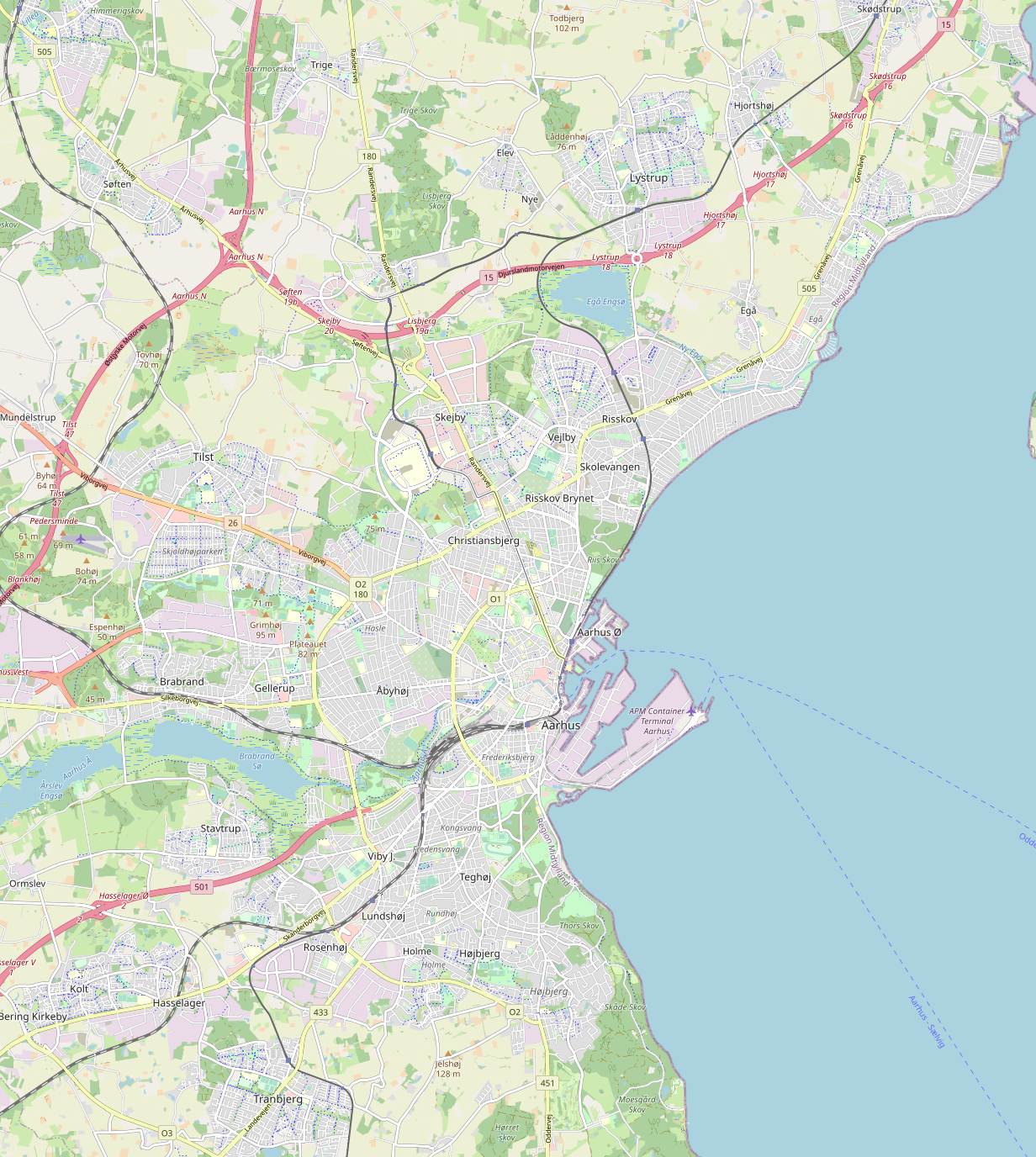
- Location within Aarhus Location within Central Denmark Region Location within Denmark

Hovmarken railway halt was a railway halt serving the eastern part of the railway town and suburb of Lystrup north of the city of Aarhus in Jutland, Denmark. The halt was located on the Grenaa railway line between Aarhus and Grenaa. It opened in 1990 as Lystrup East railway halt, and since 2019, the halt was served by the Aarhus light rail system, a tram-train network combining tram lines in the city of Aarhus with operation on railway lines in the surrounding countryside.

Hovmarken railway halt closed, effective from the summer timetable change in 2024, with the last service calling at Hovmarken on the 29th of June 2024. This was done to improve reliability on the line, which has been suffering from delays and cancellations. The closure of Hovmarken is expected to reduce travel times by up to 2 minutes, giving more room in the timetable for minor delays without spreading the delay to other services. The decision to close Hovmarken was approved by a majority in the Aarhus Municipal council on the 10th of April 2024, in spite of opposition from locals and several politicians and parties.

== See also ==
- List of railway stations in Denmark
- Rail transport in Denmark
