= Skødstrup =

- Neighborhood
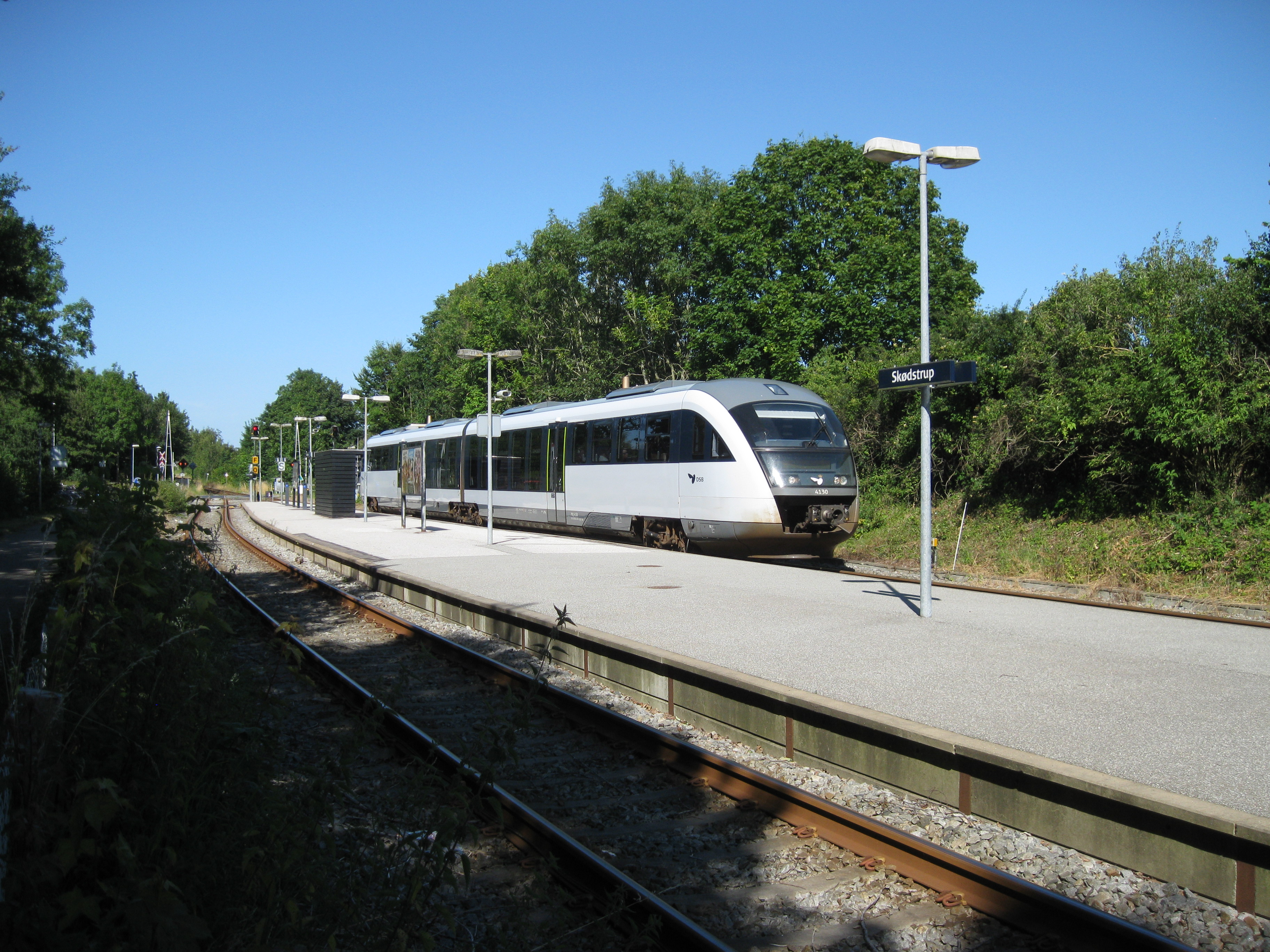
- Skødstrup Station

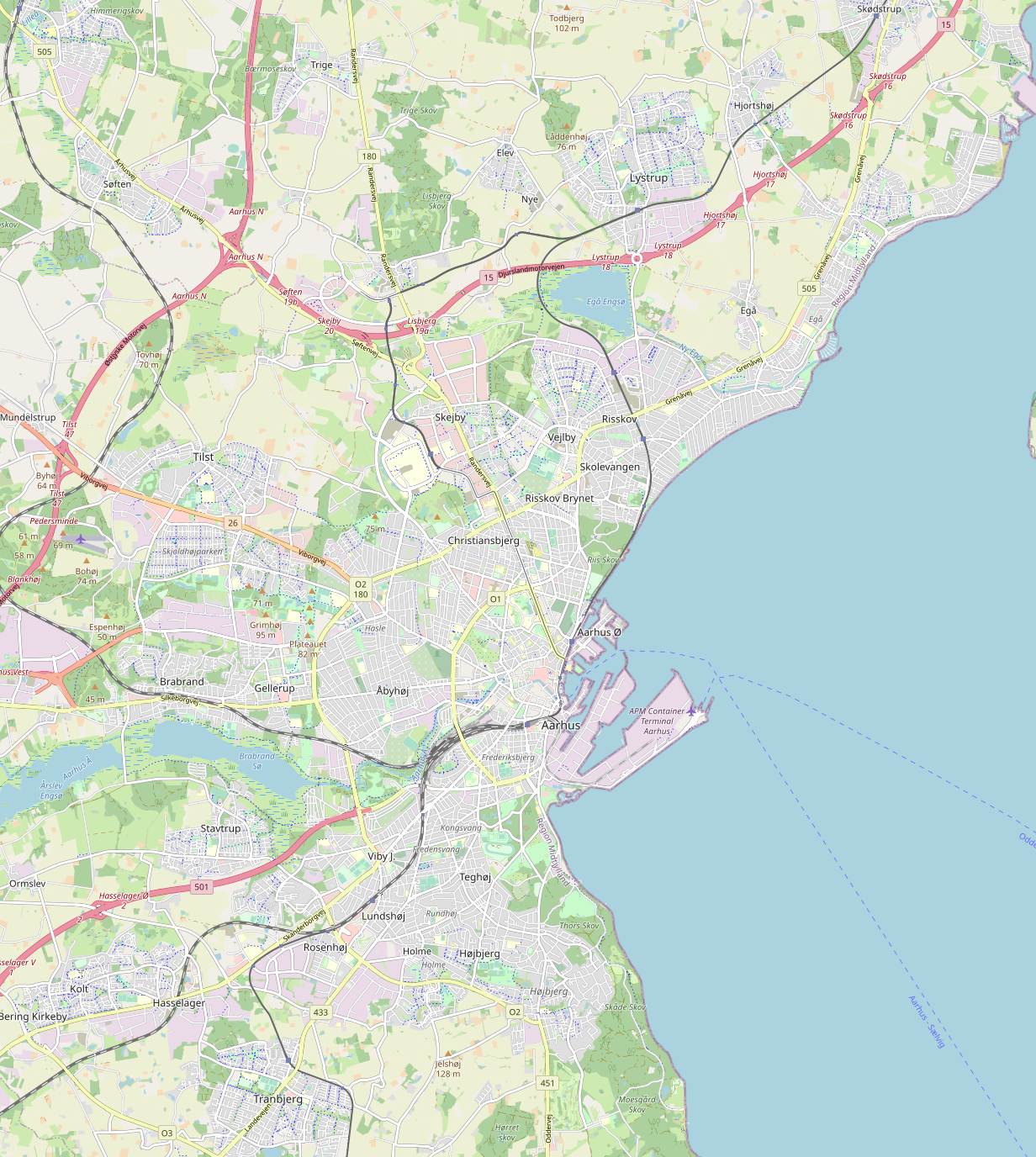
- Location within Aarhus
- Coordinates: 56.262128°N 10.301322°E
- Country: Kingdom of Denmark
- Regions of Denmark: Central Denmark Region
- Municipality: Aarhus Municipality
- District: Skødstrup

Population
  - Total: 10,000
- Postal code: 8541

Skødstrup is a suburb located north-east of Aarhus in Denmark. The suburb is also a railway town at Grenaabanen, the railroad between the cities of Aarhus and Grenaa. Today Skødstrup has grown together with the adjoining railway town of Løgten into a small urban area named Løgten-Skødstrup with a population of 8,623 (1 January 2026).

Skødstrup elementary school has more than 1250 students making it one of the largest schools in the region.
