= Aarhus Light Rail =

Light rail system serving Aarhus, Denmark

- Aarhus Letbane
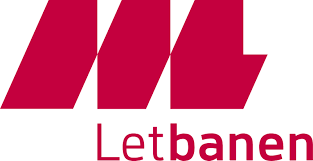

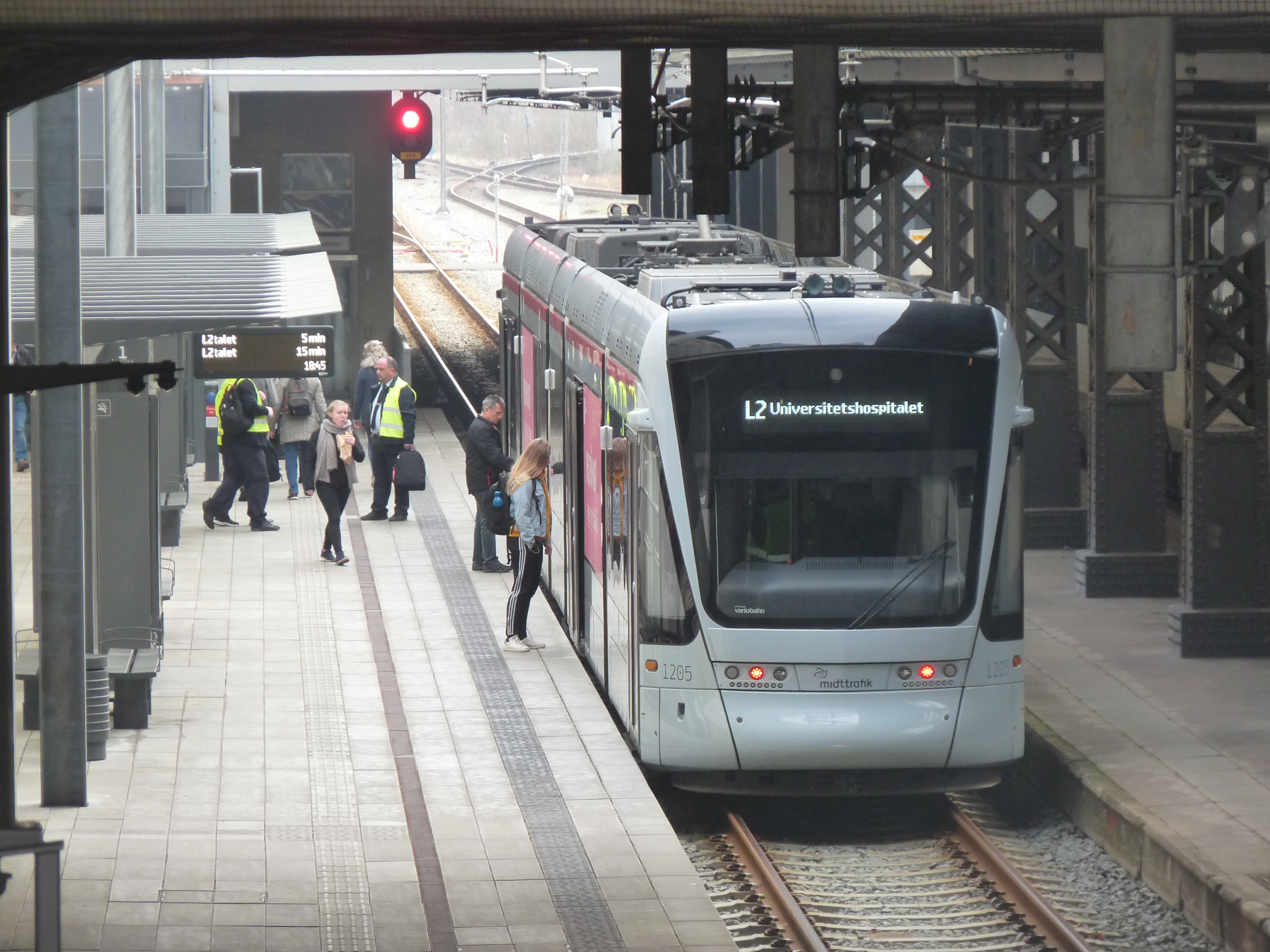
- Tram at Aarhus Central Station in 2018

Operation
- Locale: Aarhus area, Central Denmark Region, Denmark
- Open: 21 December 2017
- Status: Operational
- Lines: L1; L2
- Owners: Aarhus Municipality (50 %); Central Denmark Region (50 %)
- Operators: Midttrafik; Keolis

Infrastructure
- Track gauge: 1,435 mm (4 ft 8 1/2 in) standard gauge
- Propulsion system: Overhead line
- Electrification: 750 V DC
- Stock: 12 Stadler Tango; 14 Stadler Variobahn

Statistics
- Track length (total): 110 kilometres (68 mi)
- Stops: 51
- 2019: 4,788,295
- 2020: 3,588,597 ▼25.05%
- 2021: 3,978,596 ▲10.87%
- 2022: 5,474,521 ▲37.6%
- 2023: 5,762,063 ▲5.25%
- 2024: 6,351,212 ▲10.22%
- 2025: 6,052,728 ▼4.93%
Overview
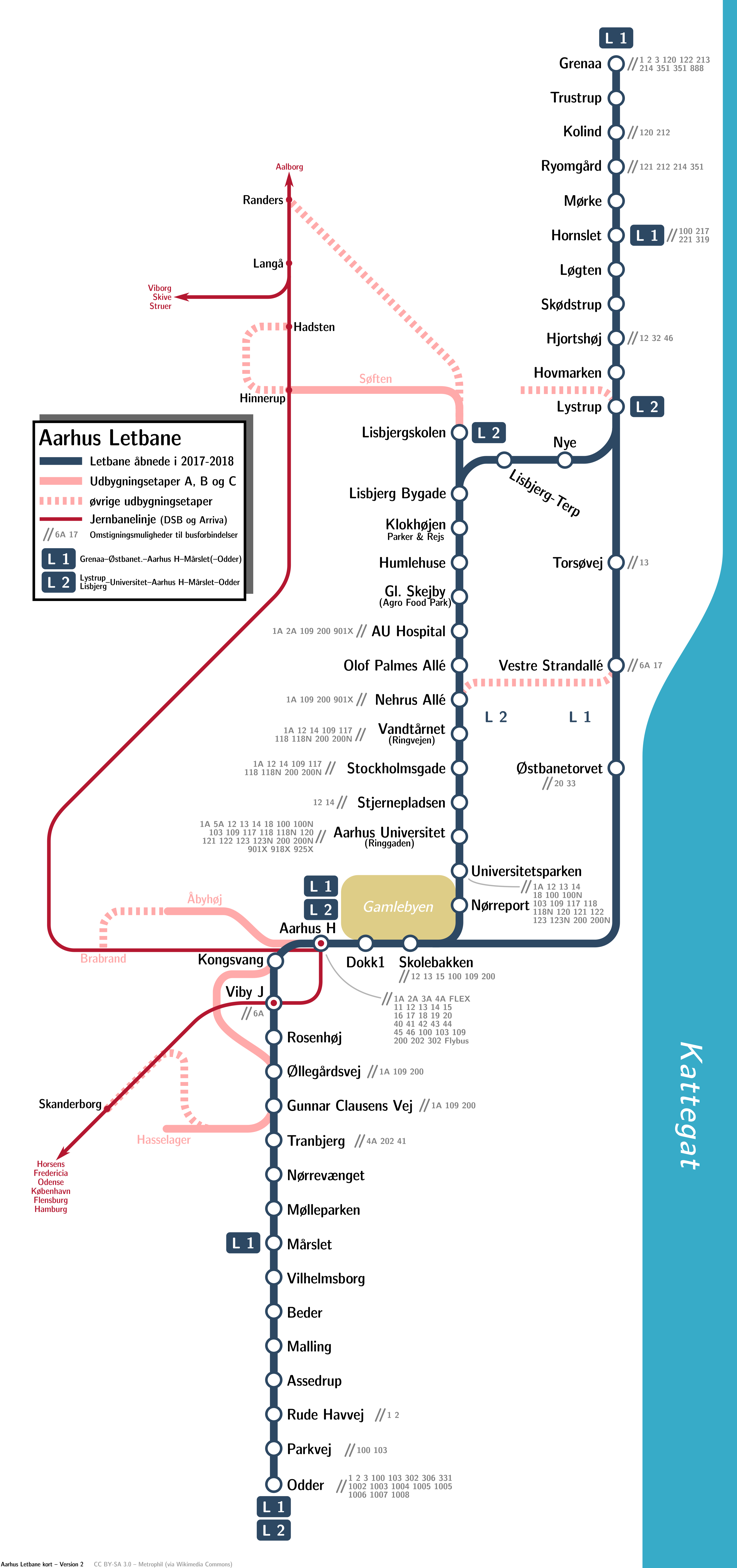

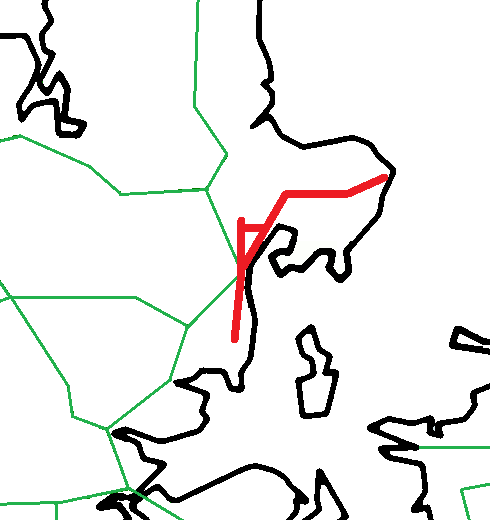
- Website: Aarhus Letbane (construction project)

The Aarhus Light Rail (Danish: Aarhus Letbane) is a light rail system with interurban characteristics serving the city of Aarhus and the surrounding region in Central Jutland, Denmark. It is operated by the local transport operator Midttrafik. The first line opened in December 2017, service on the intercity section Odder to Lisbjergskolen in August 25, 2018, and a third intercity line to Grenaa opened on 30 April 2019. More lines are being planned.

On 8 May 2012, the Danish Parliament approved the construction of the first line; work to build Phase 1 commenced during September 2013. It was originally planned to open in August 2016, but this was delayed, in part due to legislative issues in relation to railway safety.

As of 2026, the system is composed of two converted railway branchlines: the Grenaa line running 69 km (43 mi) north to Grenaa railway station and the Odder line, running 26.5 km (16.5 mi) to Odder railway station combined with a 12 km (7.5 mi) urban tram section from Aarhus Central Station to Lystrup. Due to these mixed characteristics, two types of rolling stock were considered from the start, 70 km/h (43 mph) vehicles for the urban section, and 100 km/h (62 mph) vehicles for the regional routes. Ultimately both types were supplied by the rail manufacturer Stadler.

From its opening and until the opening of the Odense light rail in May 2022, the Aarhus light rail was the only operational light rail or tram system in Denmark. (Note: Excluding museum operations such as the Danish Tramway Museum.) Denmark's third Light Rail project, the Copenhagen Light Rail, opened its first section on 26 October 2025 with the rest of the first line currently under construction.

== History ==
=== Background ===
The development of a light rail system around Aarhus, the second biggest city in Denmark, was originally proposed as early as 2006. In response to rising interest in the concept, during January 2009, the Danish Parliament granted an allocation of DKK 500 million ($85 million) to support the light rail project as part of a wider green transport package.

During October 2010, work commenced upon several studies. According to transport authority Midttrafik, who later operated the completed network, the Aarhus light rail programme had drawn considerable inspiration from tram-train operations on the tram network in Kassel, Germany. In addition, consultancy firms COWI A/S and SYSTRA contributed their own studies and technical support for the project, including an initial feasibility study and development of tender documentation. The project's Environmental Impact Assessment report was produced by C. F. Moller; it was estimated that establishing the light rail network would result in annual energy savings of 47 gigawatt hours and reduce carbon dioxide emissions by 73 tonnes (161,000 lb) during each year of operation.

Various different approaches for the network were being considered at one stage, including the full electrification of the route, the procurement of a combination of 750 V DC trams and electro-diesel tram-trains. It was recognised that, if the option of full electrification was to be exercised, a catenary-free system may be chosen for the harbour-side element of Phase 1. By late 2012, it had already been decided that Germany's BOStrab light rail regulations would be applied to the tentative network, while Lloyd's Register was appointed to serve as the independent safety assessor. By mid-2012, construction activity was scheduled to begin during June 2013, while the light rail network's opening was planned to occur during August 2016.

On 8 May 2012, the Danish Parliament gave its approval for the construction of the Aarhus light rail line, which would be the first such modern line in Denmark, and granted the legal powers to proceed with the initiative. As a consequence, the Aarhus Letbane joint venture between the local municipality, the Ministry of Transport and the Midtjylland region was formally established to promote and further the project during August 2012. The construction of Phase 1 has been estimated to have cost DKK 2.4 billion ($408 million); financing was provided by the City of Aarhus (47.2 percent), the Danish central government (47 percent) and the Central Denmark Region (5.8 per cent). Additionally, the European Investment Bank provided DKK 14.2 million to the initiative as part of the European Commission’s European Local Energy Assistance programme (ELENA).

The competitive tendering process for the network's construction was launched shortly after the formation of the joint venture. The contracts for the construction of Aarhus light rail line were awarded in three separate packages; these included a negotiated design-and-build contract that covered both the railway systems and rolling stock, valued at between €150 million and €180 million, along with a pair of lower value contracts to build the related civil works for the line. During July 2014, a German-Italian consortium, comprising Stadler Rail and Ansaldo STS, was awarded the contract for the construction and outfitting of Phase 1 of the Aarhus light rail. Stadler supplied the rolling stock for the line while Ansaldo STS provided the associated infrastructure, such as the tracks, signalling systems, control centre, and maintenance facility.

=== Phase 1 ===
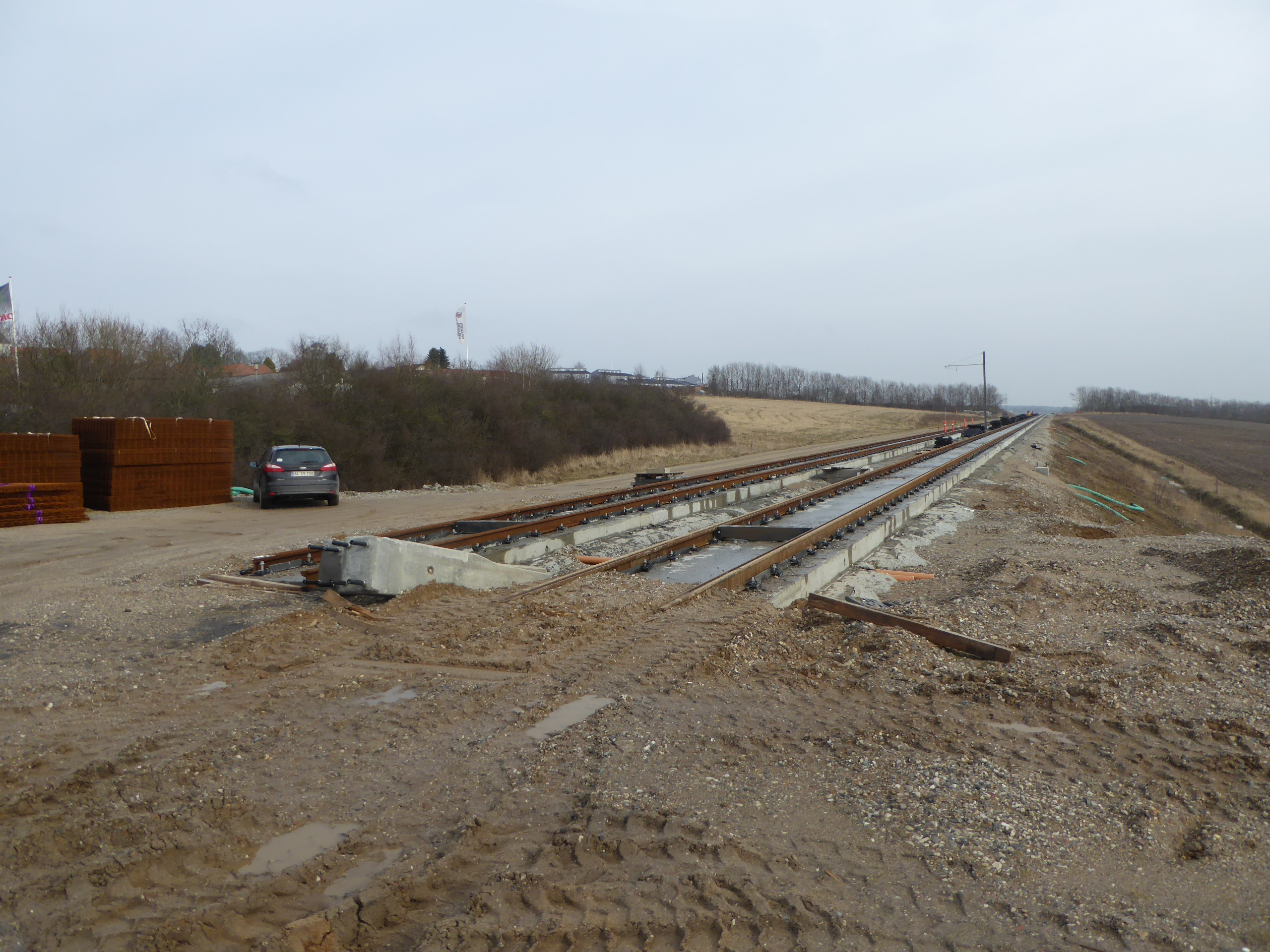
Light rail construction around Lisbjerg, 2016

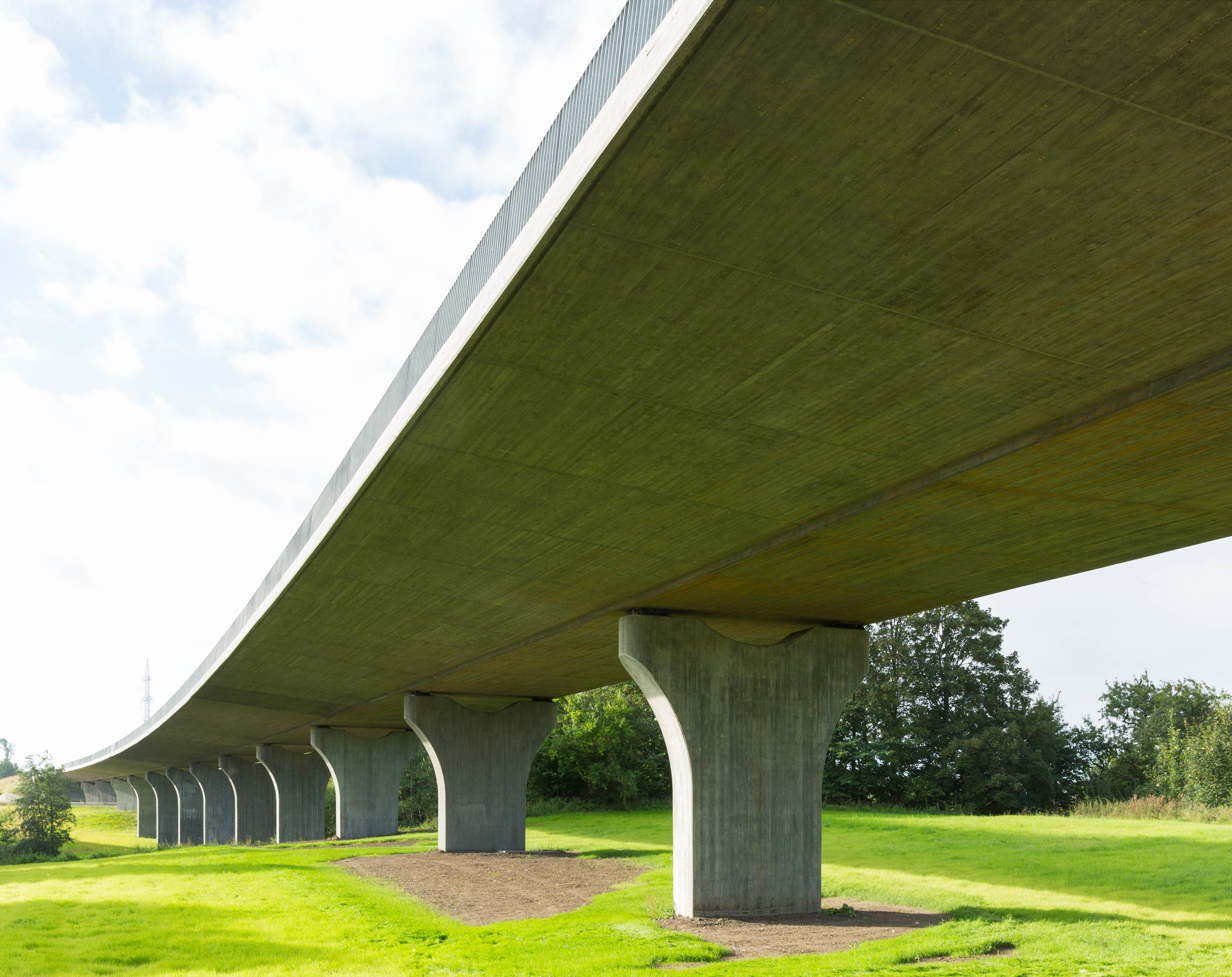
Light rail bridge over the Egaa valley (between Klokhøjen and Humelhuse stations), 2015

Phase 1 is a 12 km (7.5 mi) double-track tramway running from Aarhus Central Station, via Skejby and Lisbjerg to Lystrup. The line forms a loop spanning across Aarhus' city centre, linking into the existing regional railways running to Odder in the south and Grenaa in the northeast; to facilitate such operations, the existing Odder Line railway from Aarhus to Odder and Grenaa Line railway to Grenaa were modified to accommodate light rail services. The two existing local lines have been electrified and adapted in other ways to Phase 1, but their alignment was retained. Furthermore, the existing mainline rail station at Aarhus, along with existing park and ride facilities near major stops along the route were refurbished.

Various pieces of infrastructure and civil works were performed during the construction phase of the project. During October 2014, work commenced on the boring of a pair of tunnels to carry the tramway between Aarhus University and Aarhus University Hospital in Nørrebrogade. In the following year, both the Randers Way and Nørrebro Street had to be reduced in width in order to allocate space between the lanes for the installation of the new double-track line. In total, eight bridges had to be constructed during Phase 1; of these, the bridge over the Egaa valley, possessing a length of 347 metres (1,138 ft), is the largest bridge to be built in the programme. Overall, Phase 1 is to have a total of 110 kilometres (68 mi) long and serve 51 stops once upon completion.

The opening of Phase 1 was originally scheduled to occur on 23 September 2017; however, the event was cancelled only a few hours before the event as a result of missing security clearances from the Danish government authority. Accordingly, the opening date was pushed back to the following month, before being further delayed thereafter. It was said that both the government and the city were inexperienced with tramway operation, since no tramways existed in Denmark between 1972 and 2017, resulting in problems in interpreting the rules. Especially for the reused railway lines, it was unclear whether they could be grandfathered or must obey rules for new lines. On 20 December 2017, it was announced that approval for the new lines had finally been issued, allowing for services on the central tram section to commence during the following day. Traffic on the Odder line and to Lisbjergskolen was delayed more and started on 25 August 2018. Traffic to Grenaa opened on 30 April 2019.

In March of 2025, due to a major issue with the magnetic track brakes on Aarhus Letbane's Variobahn trains and the way the interact with certain points at Universitetshospitalet and Lisbjerg Bygade, services were, for safety reasons, banned from using the middle track at Universitetshospitalet station, used for terminating services turning around, as well as the spur line leading to Lisbjergskolen. This limited services on the core section of the L2 line between Aarhus Central Station and Universitetshospitalet to four trains per hour in each direction, down 50% from the ordinary eight trains per hour, as well as completely preventing service to Lisbjergskolen, with these services instead rerouted to Lystrup, increasing service of Lisbjerg-Terp, Nye and Lystrup stations to four trains per hour on the L2 line, up from the ordinary two trains per hour. The issues with the Variobahn trams also lead to frequent shortages of available trains for service, resulting in peak-hour services on the L1 line between Aarhus Central Station and Hornslet being removed from the timetable from the 20th of October 2025. These issues, combined with evening and weekend engineering works on the Odder line section of the L2 line during the first three months of 2026, are believed to be the main cause of a major decrease in passenger numbers on large parts of the light rail system compared to the first quarter of the year before. The issues with the Variobahn brakes and the points were resolved during the summer of 2026 and full service recommenced starting on the 10th of August 2026.

=== Future ===
Even prior to work commencing on Phase 1, several expansion plans had already been discussed. During January 2018, it was publicly stated that options for the construction of two new branches, from Lisbjerg to Hinnerup (8 km (5.0 mi)) and from Aarhus to Brabrand (11 km (6.8 mi)), were in the detailed planning phase.

== Rolling stock ==
From an early stage in the project, it became clear that two different types of rolling stock would be required; to service the city center areas, conventional trams capable of up to 70 km/h (43 mph) were recommended, while trams capable of a maximum speed of 100 km/h (62 mph) would be necessary to conduct the longer distance routes. Accordingly, contracts have been signed with Swiss rolling stock manufacturer Stadler for the delivery of two types of trams for the network:

- Stadler Tango: 12 vehicles, max speed 100 km/h (62 mph), used between Grenaa and Aarhus H station
- Stadler Variobahn: 14 vehicles, max speed 80 km/h (50 mph), used between Odder and Lystrup

=== Future ===
On 2 December 2025, Aarhus Letbane entered an agreement with Stadler for the supply of 8 Citylink trams in order to increase service frequency, with options for up to 12 additional units. The trams will have four segments and a capacity of 152 seated passengers and 180 standees, an increase of 80 over the current Stadler Tango trams. The trams are expected in 2029 and will be equipped with an onboard battery pack in order to enable operation in the event of overhead line icing.

=== Table ===
Rolling stock of the Aarhus Light Rail system
Year	Manufacturer	Model	Image	Quantity	Speed	Capacity	Numbers
2016	Stadler	Variobahn		14	80 km/h (50 mph)	216	1001 - 1014
2016	Stadler	Tango		12	100 km/h (62 mph)	252	2001 - 2012
2029	Stadler	Citylink		8 (option for 12 more)	100 km/h (62 mph)	332	

=== Gallery ===
Stadler Tango

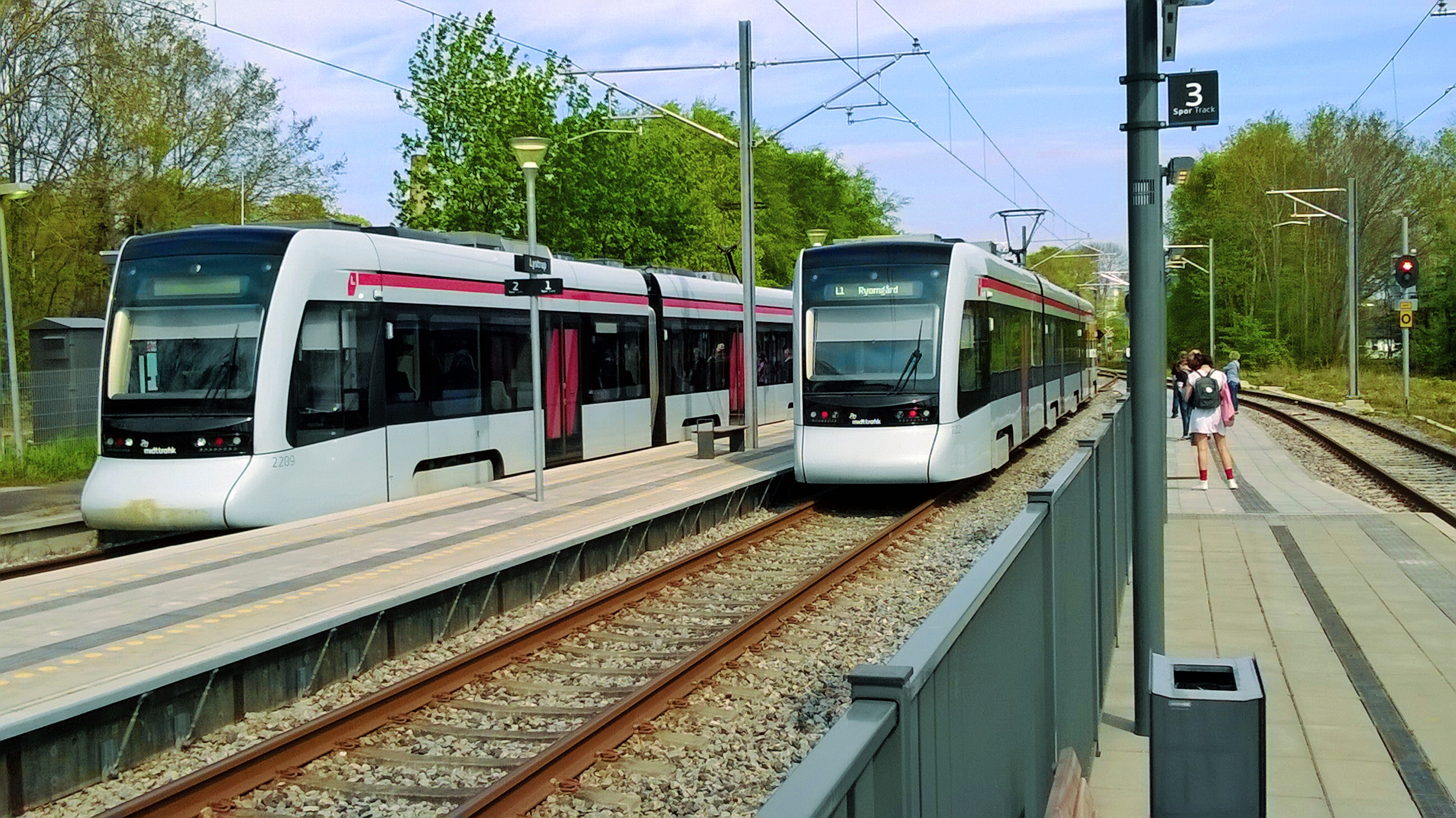
Exterior (at Lystrup)

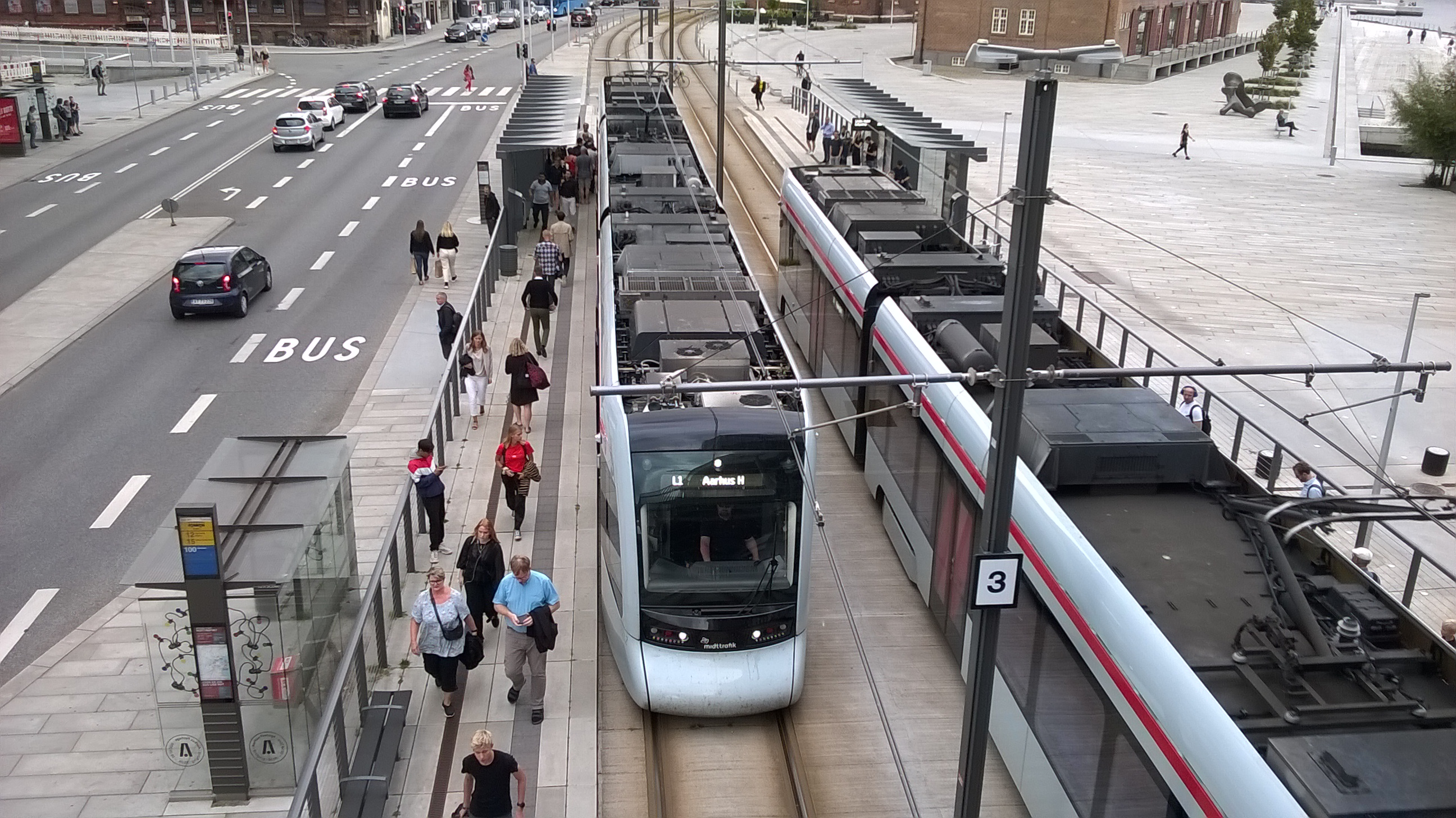
Top view (at Dokk1)

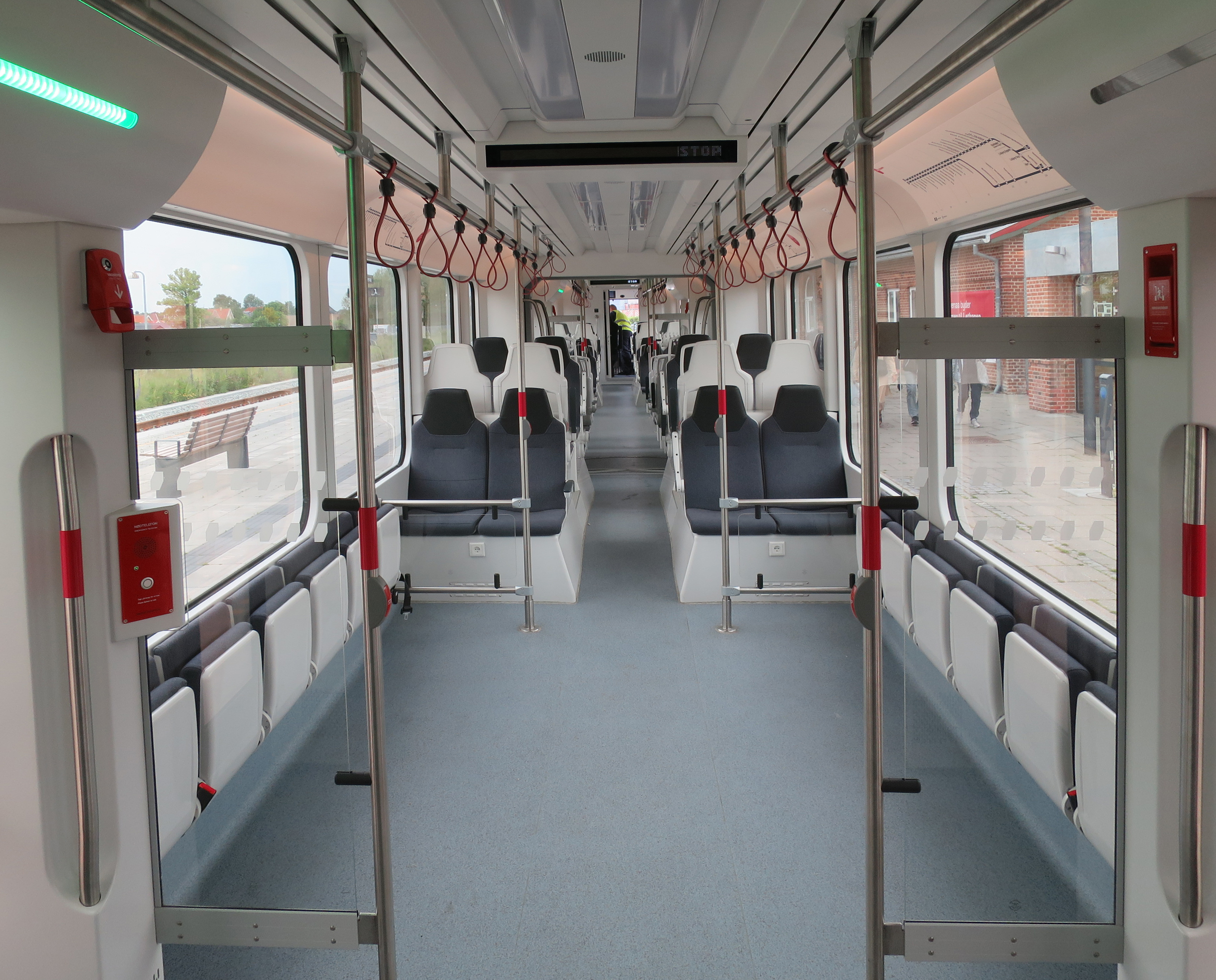
Interior
Stadler Variobahn

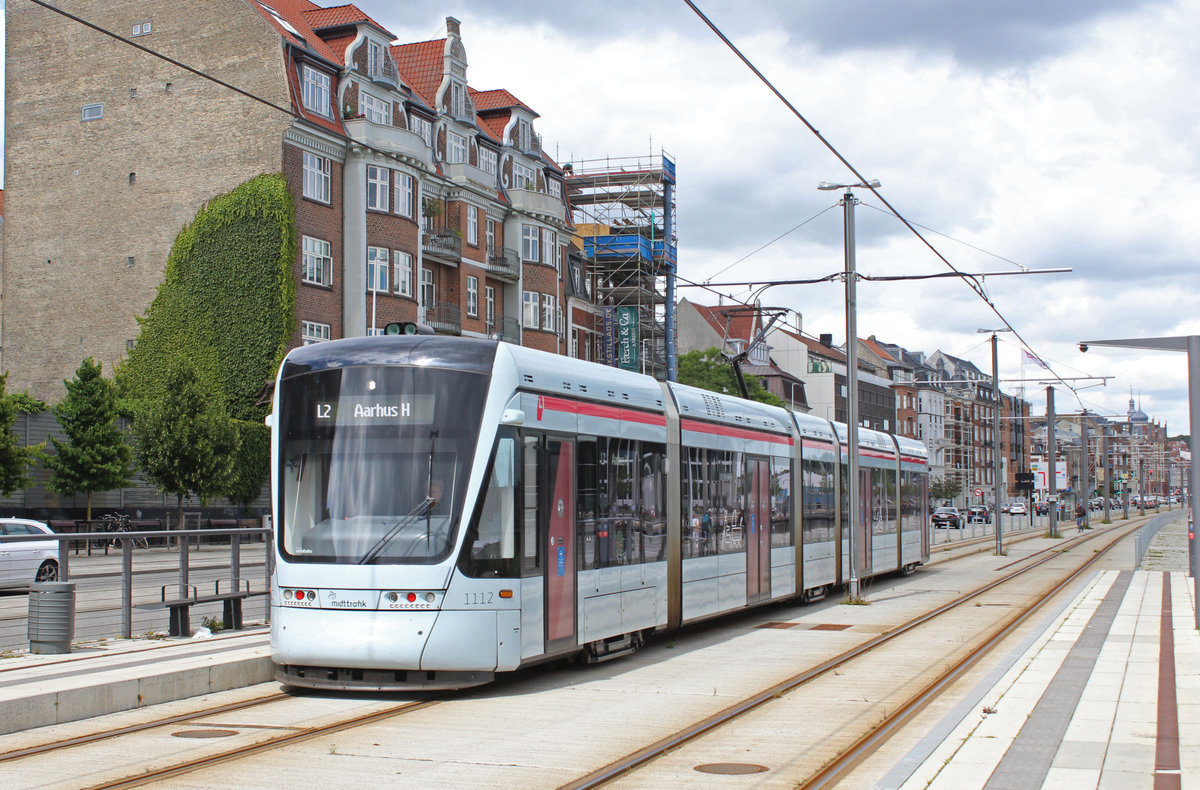
Exterior (at Skolebakken)

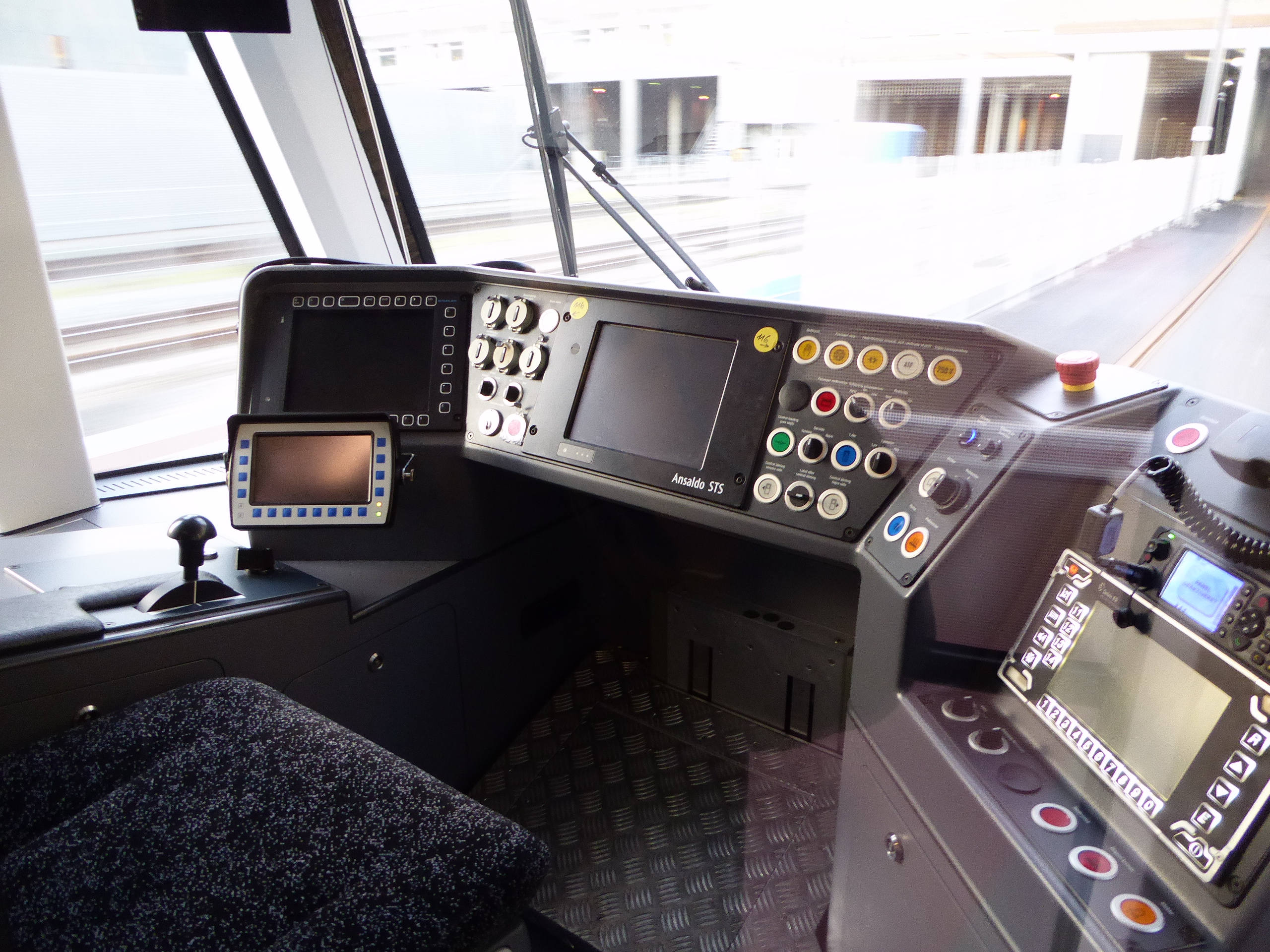
Controls

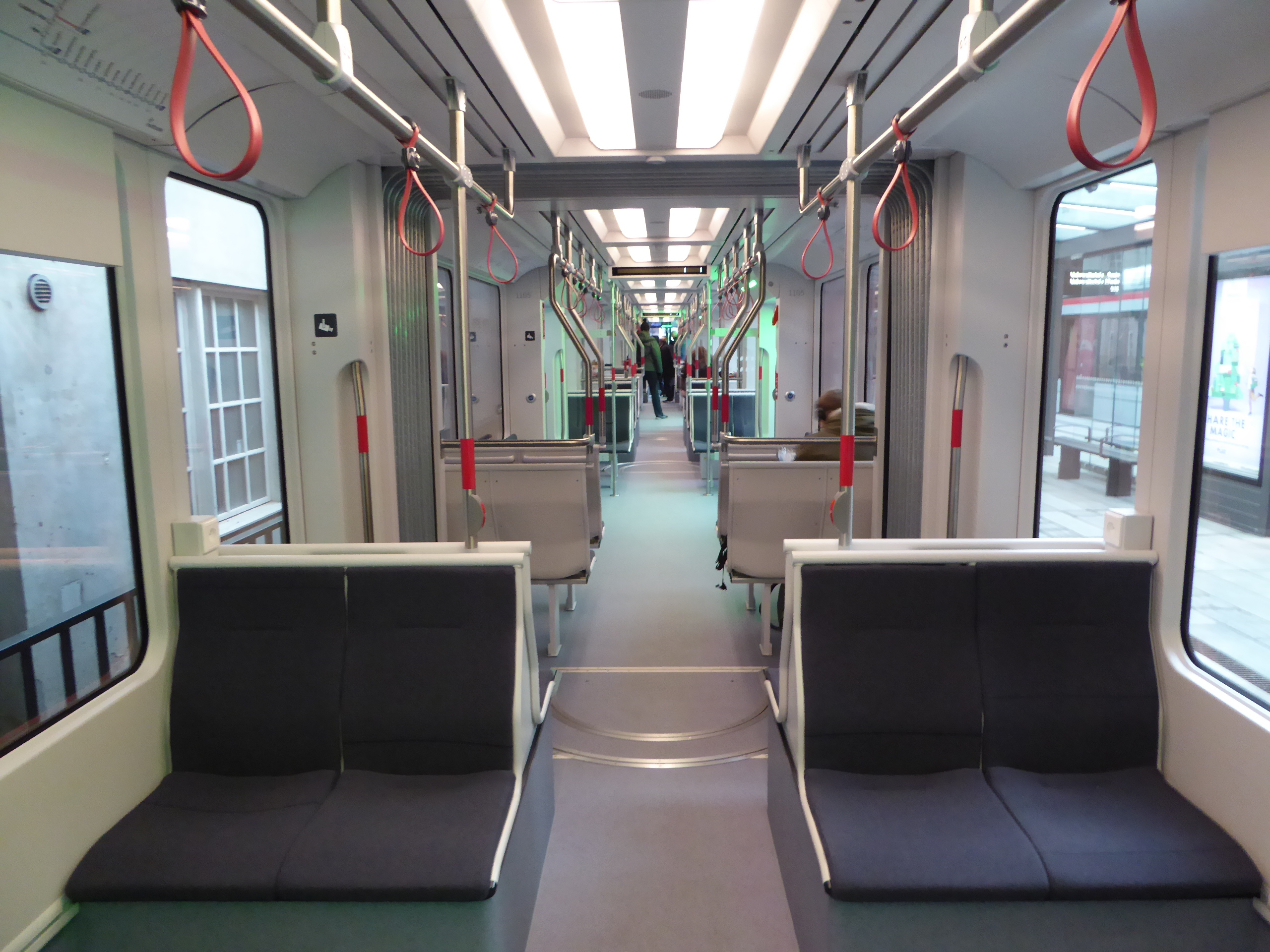
Interior

== Stations ==
Grenaa Line (L1)
- Grenaa
- Hessel
- Trustrup
- Kolind
- Ryomgård
- Thorsager
- Mørke
- Hornslet
- Løgten
- Skødstrup
- Hjortshøj
- Hovmarken (closed)
- Lystrup (connection to L2)
- Torsøvej
- Vestre Strandallé
- Risskov Strandpark
- Østbanetorvet
- Skolebakken (connection to L2)
- Dokk1
- Aarhus H (railway, end L1)
Central tramway (L2)
- Lystrup (connection to L1)
- Nye
- Lisbjerg - Terp
- Lisbjergskolen
- Lisbjerg Bygade
- Klokhøjen
- Humlehuse
- Gl. Skejby
- AU Hospital
- Olof Palmes Allé
- Nehrus Allé
- Vandtårnet
- Stockholmsgade
- Stjernepladsen
- Aarhus Universitet
- Universitetsparken
- Nørreport
- Skolebakken (connection to L1)
- Dokk1
- Aarhus H (railway)
Odder Line (L2)
- Aarhus H (railway)
- Kongsvang
- Viby J (railway)
- Rosenhøj
- Øllegårdsvej
- Gunnar Clausensvej
- Tranbjerg
- Nørrevænget
- Mølleparken
- Mårslet
- Vilhelmsborg
- Beder
- Malling
- Assedrup
- Rude Havvej
- Odder (end of L2)

== Ridership ==
Yearly and quarterly passenger numbers
Year	1st Quarter	2nd Quarter	3rd Quarter	4th Quarter	Yearly total
2019	1,155,732	1,078,250	1,195,476	1,358,837	4,788,295
2020	1,145,088	672,821	908,100	907,588	3,588,597
2021	580,619	970,400	1,085,755	1,341,822	3,978,596
2022	1,228,418	1,365,131	1,512,101	1,368,871	5,474,521
2023	1,413,906	1,301,629	1,474,186	1,572,372	5,762,063
2024	1,590,327	1,644,588	1,532,732	1,583,565	6,351,212
2025	1,582,772	1,469,812	1,469,516	1,530,628	6,052,728
2026	1,491,429	1,320,030	1,437,595		4,249,054

In June of 2024, and again in April of 2025 and May of 2026, the local Århus Stiftstidende newspaper released the official passenger numbers for all stations on Aarhus Letbane for the first quarter of the respective year:

Individual station's passenger numbers for January, February and March of 2024, 2025 and 2026
Station	Total passenger number (1st quarter 2024)	Total passenger number (1st quarter 2025)	Total passenger number (1st quarter 2026)*	Lines served
Grenaa	28,532	28,936	28,787	L1
Hessel	2,904	3,847	3,666	L1
Trustrup	4,059	4,751	5,003	L1
Kolind	9,600	10,148	9,849	L1
Ryomgård	21,959	22,338	21,749	L1
Thorsager	4,009	4,588	4,911	L1
Mørke	10,200	10,227	9,328	L1
Hornslet	25,003	27,446	24,126	L1
Løgten	12,030	12,728	14,281	L1
Skødstrup	23,825	24,266	21,128	L1
Hjortshøj	25,204	26,128	23,847	L1
Hovmarken	4,286	N/A (Note: The station was closed in June 2024.)	N/A	L1
Lystrup	69,694	74,121	76,863	L1, L2
Torsøvej	33,226	33,421	31,457	L1
Vestre Strandallé	21,310	21,718	17,011	L1
Risskov Strandpark	7,489	9,438	No number given	L1
Østbanetorvet	22,948	24,094	23,265	L1
Nye	3,645	4,016	4,649	L2
Lisbjerg-Terp	2,409	2,232	2,856	L2
Lisbjergskolen	14,622	18,812	0 (Note: The station lost service during this time due to issues with magnetic track brakes)	L2
Lisbjerg Bygade	12,196	13,158	15,416	L2
Klokhøjen	6,489	6,692	16,391 (Note: Serves a park-and-ride facility which during this period trialed combined free parking and free travel with the light rail for those parking during the morning peak, which resulted in a major increase in passenger numbers.)	L2
Humlehuse	4,721	4,451	4,177	L2
Gl. Skejby (Agro Food Park)	9,983	9,892	9,977	L2
Universitetshospitalet	108,178	101,419	73,306	L2
Olof Palmes Allé	47,537	45,433	35,219	L2
Nehrus Allé	38,212	37,378	32,747	L2
Vandtårnet (Ringvejen)	51,016	56,019	36,382	L2
Stockholmsgade	36,132	36,142	23,281	L2
Stjernepladsen	52,859	52,999	44,435	L2
Aarhus Universitet (Ringgaden)	81,417	74,078	46,584	L2
Universitetsparken	26,721	24,796	19,632	L2
Nørreport	79,489	77,142	57,276	L2
Skolebakken	73,771	76,427	60,195	L1, L2
Dokk1	74,133	76,750	71,030	L1, L2
Aarhus H	340,893	332,467	256,653	L1, L2
Kongsvang	5,736	5,195	3,857	L2
Viby J	44,592	44,176	36,601	L2
Rosenhøj	21,057	20,780	14,377	L2
Øllegårdsvej	4,718	6,781	6,510	L2
Gunnar Clausens Vej	17,036	14,513	8,934	L2
Tranbjerg	21,405	20,786	16,603	L2
Nørrevænget	6,400	6,442	5,489	L2
Mølleparken	3,818	3,701	3,293	L2
Mårslet	25,598	23,885	20,412	L2
Vilhelmsborg	573	857	688	L2
Beder	7,824	7,584	5,051	L2
Malling	13,215	12,148	9,310	L2
Assedrup	941	945	665	L2
Rude Havvej	4,857	4,907	3,557	L2
Odder	21,888	21,778	17,112	L2

In February of 2023, Århus Stiftstidende released the official passenger numbers for all stations on Aarhus Letbane, except Trustrup. These numbers are the daily average of passengers boarding at each respective station on weekdays from the 15th of August 2022 to the 18th of December 2022. See below for each station's passenger numbers.

Aarhus Light Rail average ridership per weekday by station, August – December 2022
Station	Average ridership	Lines served
Grenaa	479	L1
Hessel	39	L1
Trustrup	No data	L1
Kolind	148	L1
Ryomgård	334	L1
Thorsager	67	L1
Mørke	140	L1
Hornslet	386	L1
Løgten	167	L1
Skødstrup	295	L1
Hjortshøj	319	L1
Hovmarken	64	L1
Lystrup	915	L1, L2
Torsøvej	337	L1
Vestre Strandallé	231	L1
Risskov Strandpark	118	L1
Østbanetorvet	274	L1
Nye	43	L2
Lisbjerg-Terp	30	L2
Lisbjergskolen	106	L2
Lisbjerg Bygade	136	L2
Klokhøjen	71	L2
Humlehuse	41	L2
Gl. Skejby (Agro Food Park)	96	L2
Universitetshospitalet	1233	L2
Olof Palmes Allé	608	L2
Nehrus Allé	442	L2
Vandtårnet (Ringvejen)	631	L2
Stockholmsgade	451	L2
Stjernepladsen	627	L2
Aarhus Universitet (Ringgaden)	1075	L2
Universitetsparken	405	L2
Nørreport	1055	L2
Skolebakken	1079	L1, L2
Dokk1	983	L1, L2
Aarhus H	4409	L1, L2
Kongsvang	81	L2
Viby J	678	L2
Rosenhøj	314	L2
Øllegårdsvej	69	L2
Gunnar Clausens Vej	244	L2
Tranbjerg	339	L2
Nørrevænget	92	L2
Mølleparken	79	L2
Mårslet	413	L2
Vilhelmsborg	13	L2
Beder	144	L2
Malling	207	L2
Assedrup	15	L2
Rude Havvej	80	L2
Odder	404	L2

== See also ==
- Greater Copenhagen Light Rail
- List of town tramway systems in Denmark
- Odense Letbane
