= Lystrup railway station =

Railway station in Aarhus, Denmark

Lystrup
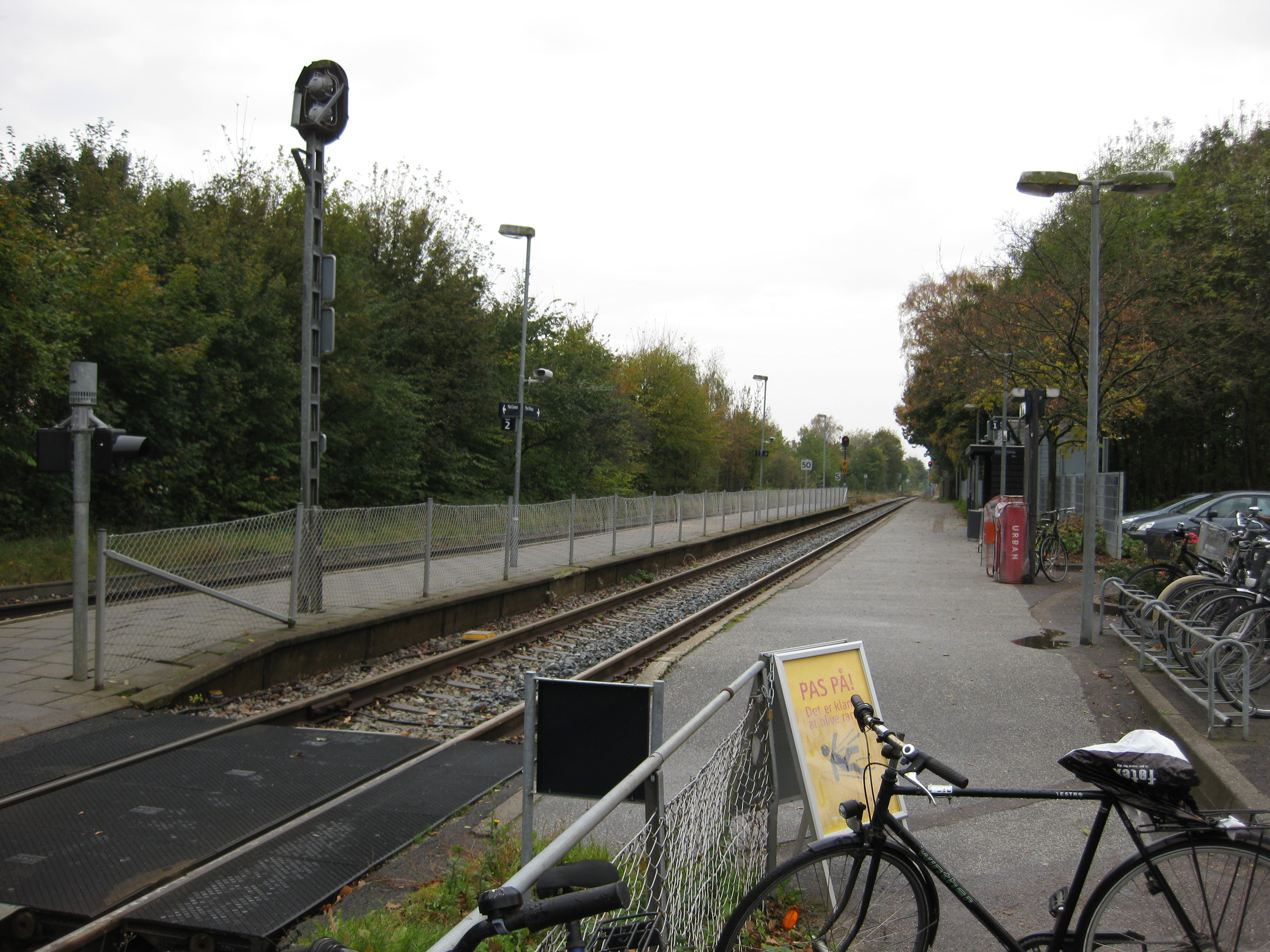
- Lystrup railway station in 2010

General information
- Location: Lystrup Stationsvej; 8520 Lystrup; Aarhus Municipality; Denmark
- Coordinates: 56°13′51″N 10°14′4″E
- Elevation: 24.1 metres (79 ft)
- Owner: Banedanmark
- Operator: Aarhus Light Rail
- Line: Grenaa Line
- Platforms: 2
- Tracks: 2

History
- Opened: 1877

Services
Preceding station	Aarhus Letbane	Following station
Torsøvej towards Odder or Mårslet	Line 1	Hjortshøj towards Grenaa or Hornslet
Nye towards Odder	Line 2	Terminus
Location

Lystrup station is a railway station serving the railway town and suburb of Lystrup north of the city of Aarhus in Jutland, Denmark.

The station is located on the Grenaa railway line between Aarhus and Grenaa. It opened in 1877 with the opening of the Aarhus-Ryomgård section of the railway line. Since 2019, the station has been served by the Aarhus light rail system, a tram-train network combining tram lines in the city of Aarhus with operation on railway lines in the surrounding countryside.

== See also ==
- List of railway stations in Denmark
