= Odder railway station =

Railway station in East Jutland, Denmark

Odder
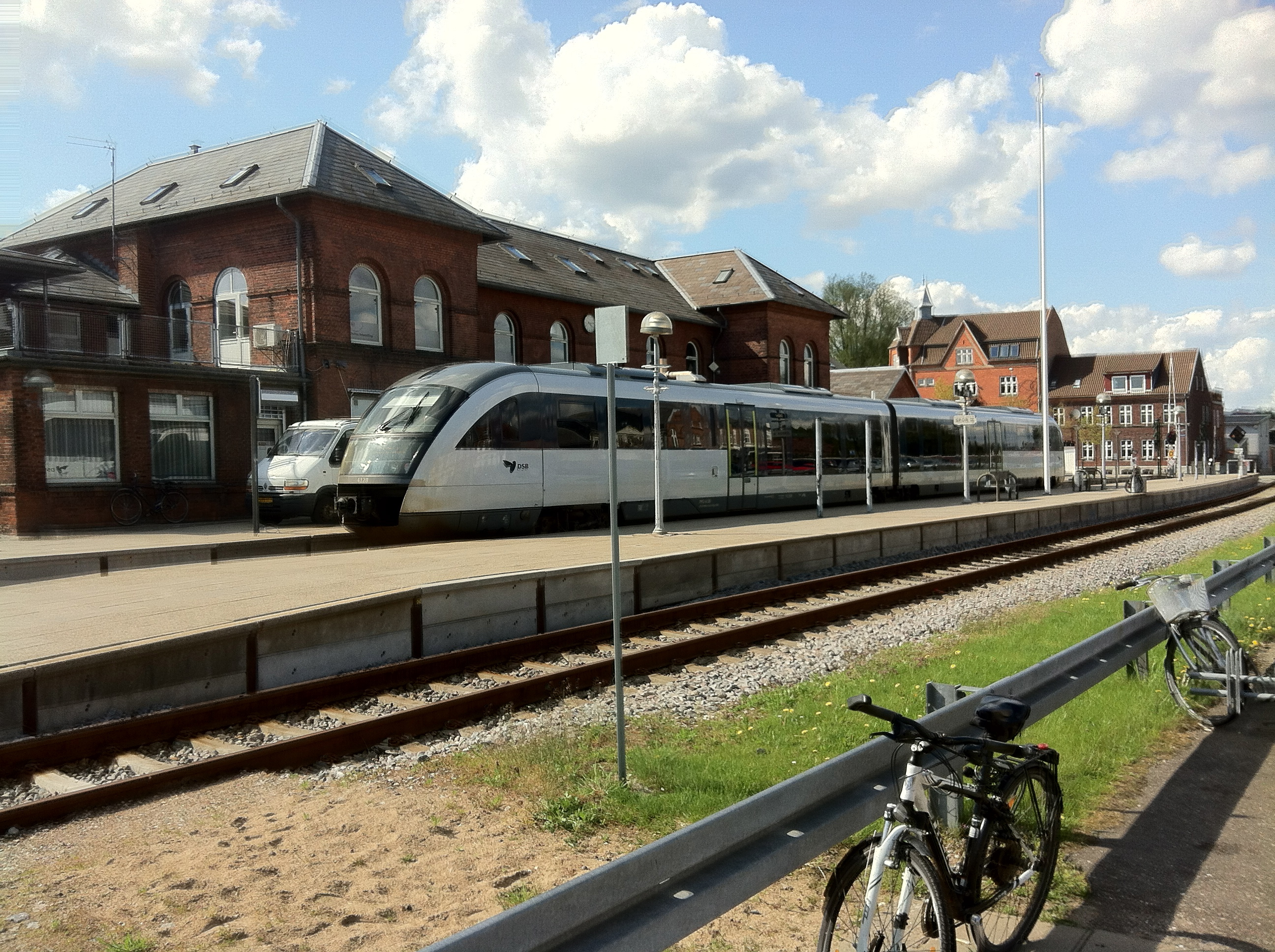
- Platform facade of Odder station in 2013

General information
- Location: Banegårdsgade 3; 8300 Odder; Odder Municipality; Denmark
- Coordinates: 55°58′19.07″N 10°9′1.09″E
- Elevation: 11.7 metres (38 ft)
- Operator: Aarhus Letbane
- Line: Odder Line
- Platforms: 2
- Tracks: 2

Construction
- Architect: Heinrich Wenck

History
- Opened: 19 June 1884
Location

Odder station (Danish: Odder Banegård) is a railway station serving the town of Odder, Denmark.

The station is the southern terminus of the Odder Line from Aarhus to Odder. The station opened in 1884 with the opening of the Hads-Ning Herreders Jernbane from Aarhus to Hov. Since 2019, the station has been served by the Aarhus light rail system, a tram-train network combining tram lines in the city of Aarhus with operation on railway lines in the surrounding countryside.

== History ==
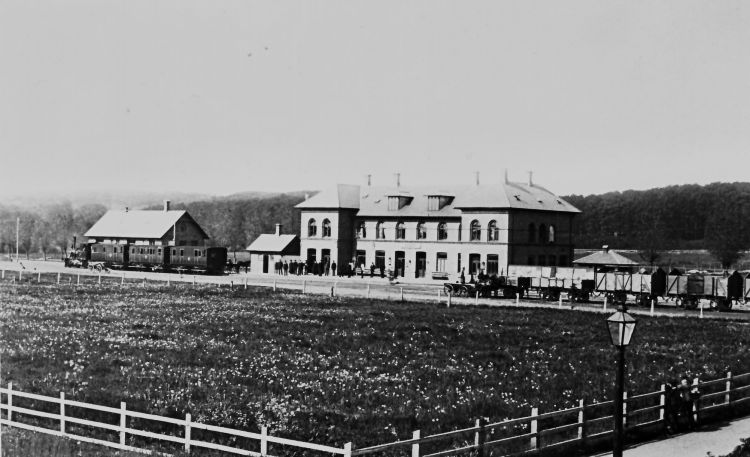
The newly opened Odder station in 1884.

The station opened on 19 June 1884 as the railway company Hads-Ning Herreders Jernbane (HHJ) opened a railway line from Aarhus to Hov. In 1904, Odder station also became the eastern terminus of the new Horsens-Odder railway line, which connected Odder with Horsens.

The Horsens-Odder Line closed in 1967, whereas the section of the Odder Line from Odder to Hov was closed in 1977 and Odder station became the southern terminus of the Odder Line. In 2016, the station was temporarily closed along with the Odder Line while it was being reconstructed to form part of the Aarhus light rail system, which opened in 2017.

== See also ==
- List of railway stations in Denmark
- Rail transport in Denmark

| Preceding station | Aarhus Letbane | Following station |
|---|---|---|
| Terminus | Line 2 | Rude Havvej towards Lisbjergskolen or Lystrup |
