= Kongsvang tram stop =

Tram station in Aarhus, Denmark

Kongsvang
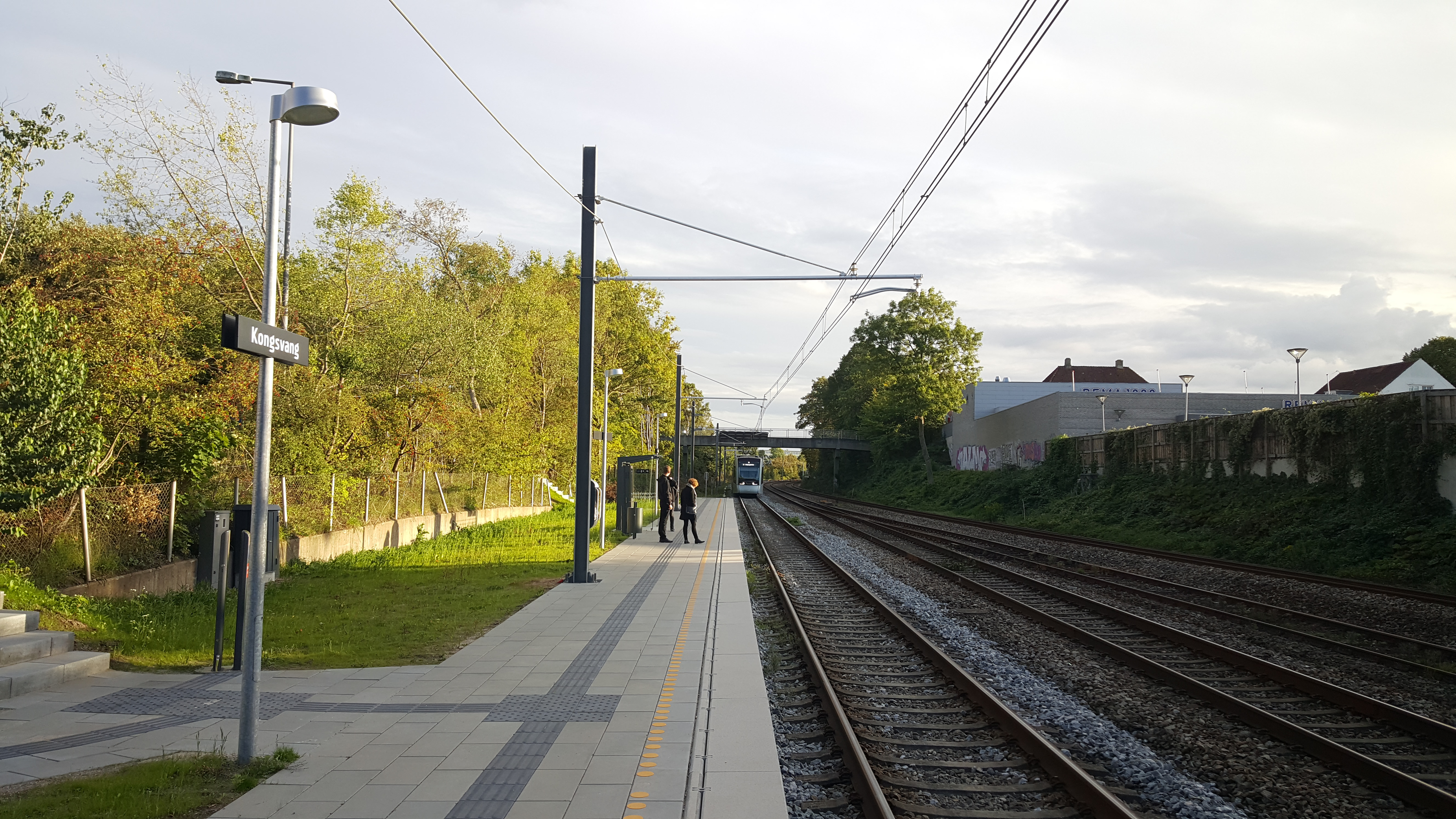
- Kongsvang tramway halt in 2018

General information
- Location: Gammel Kongevej; 8260 Viby J Aarhus Municipality; Denmark
- Coordinates: 56°8′7″N 10°10′27″E
- Elevation: 26.9 metres (88 ft)
- Line: Odder Line
- Platforms: 1
- Tracks: 1 (3 incl those without stops)

History
- Rebuilt: 2018
Location

Kongsvang tram stop is a tram station serving the district of Viby in the city of Aarhus in Jutland, Denmark. The tram stop is located on the Odder Line between Aarhus and Odder, part of Aarhus Letbane (Aarhus light rail). The Fredericia-Aarhus Line passes through the station. Until 2016 this was a railway halt, part of Aarhus Nærbane. From 2016 to 2018, the station was temporarily closed along with the Grenaa Line while being reconstructed and electrified to form part of the Aarhus light rail system.

== See also ==
- List of railway stations in Denmark

Preceding station	Aarhus Letbane	Following station
Viby J towards Odder	Line 2	Aarhus Central towards Lisbjergskolen or Lystrup
