= EUX =

EUX, Eux, or eux can refer to:

- eux, the disjunctive form of ils (meaning they) in French; see French personal pronouns
- F. D. Roosevelt Airport, an airport in the island of Sint Eustatius in the Caribbean Netherlands, by IATA code
- Euxenite, a brownish black mineral, by mineral code
- Sint Eustatius Volleyball Association, a volleyball association on the island of Sint Eustatius in the Caribbean Netherlands, by abbreviation; see North, Central America and Caribbean Volleyball Confederation#ECVA (Eastern Caribbean Zonal Volleyball Association)
- Eux, a 1963 studio album by Italian-French singer Dalida; see Dalida discography#Studio albums

== See also ==
- EUX Business, a type of business education program offered by Aarhus Business College in Aarhus, Denmark
- EUX.TV, a TV station based in Brussels, Belgium that covers European Union policy
