= Viby Jylland railway station =

Railway station in Aarhus, Denmark

Viby Jylland
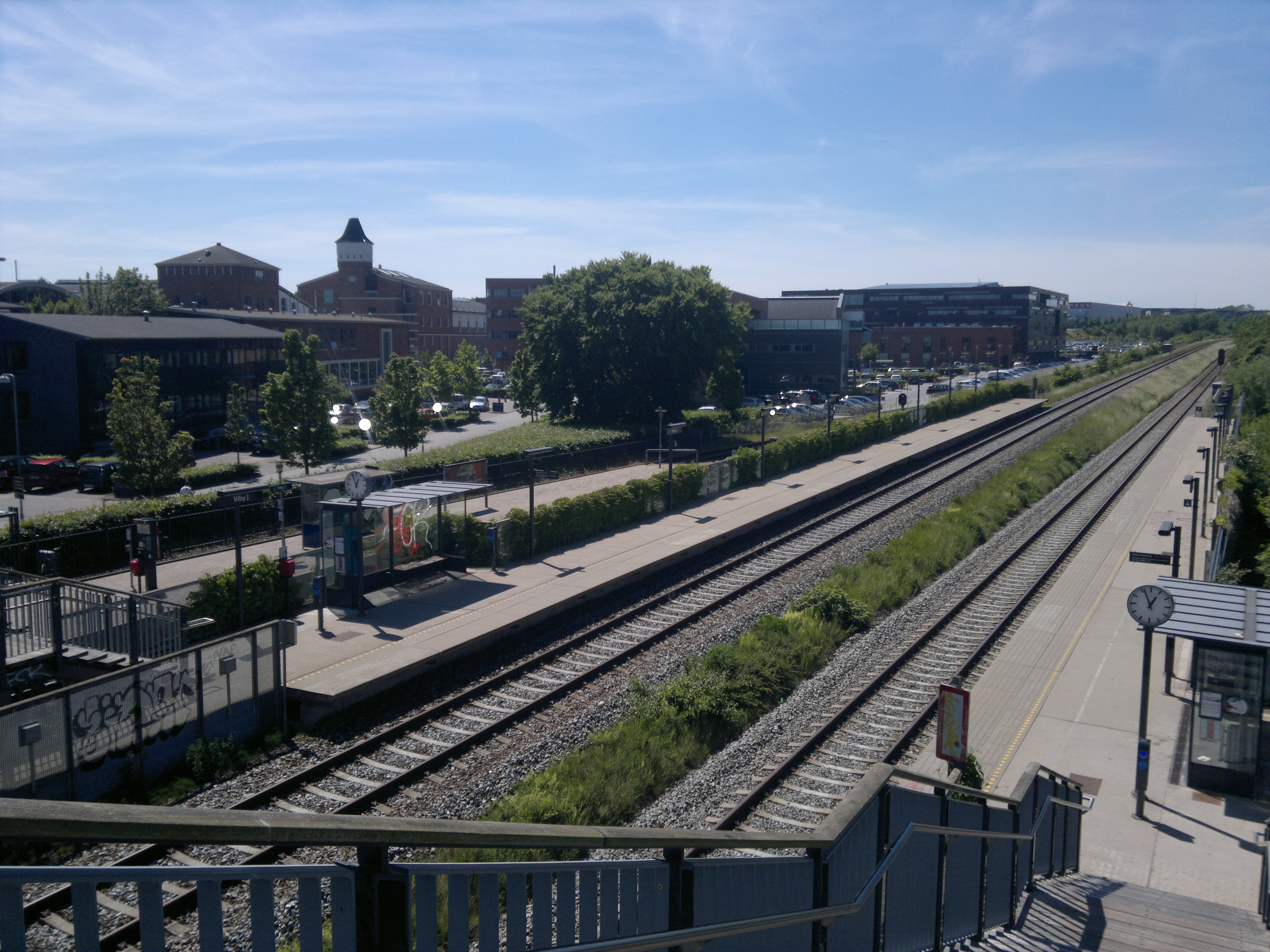
- Viby Jylland station in 2012

General information
- Location: Sønderhøj 5; 8260 Viby J Aarhus Municipality; Denmark
- Coordinates: 56°7′19″N 10°9′35″E
- Elevation: 32.6 metres (107 ft)
- Owner: DSB (station infrastructure); Banedanmark (rail infrastructure)
- Lines: Fredericia-Aarhus Line; Odder Line
- Platforms: 3
- Tracks: 4
- Train operators: DSB; GoCollective; Aarhus Letbane

Other information
- Fare zone: 20

History
- Rebuilt: 2018
- Electrified: 2018 (tramway); 2026 (planned for the railway)
Location

Viby Jylland railway station is a tram-train and railway station serving the district of Viby J in the city of Aarhus in East Jutland, Denmark.

The station is located on the Fredericia-Aarhus Line from Fredericia to Aarhus. It offers regional train services to Aarhus, Esbjerg, Herning and Skjern. The train services are operated by DSB and GoCollective.

The station is also located on the Odder Line between Aarhus and Odder, part of the Aarhus light rail system. In 2016 to 2018, the Odder Line was temporarily closed along with the Grenaa Line while it was being reconstructed to form part of the Aarhus light rail system including electrification.

== See also ==
- List of railway stations in Denmark

Preceding station	DSB	Following station
Skanderborg towards Copenhagen Central	Copenhagen-Aalborg InterCity	Aarhus Central towards Aalborg Airport
Skanderborg towards Fredericia	Fredericia-Aarhus Regional train	Aarhus Central Terminus
Preceding station	GoCollective	Following station
Hørning towards Skjern	Aarhus–Skjern Regional train	Aarhus Central Terminus
Preceding station	Aarhus Letbane	Following station
Rosenhøj towards Odder	Line 2	Kongsvang towards Lisbjergskolen or Lystrup
