= Hedensted railway station =

Railway station in East Jutland, Denmark

Hedensted
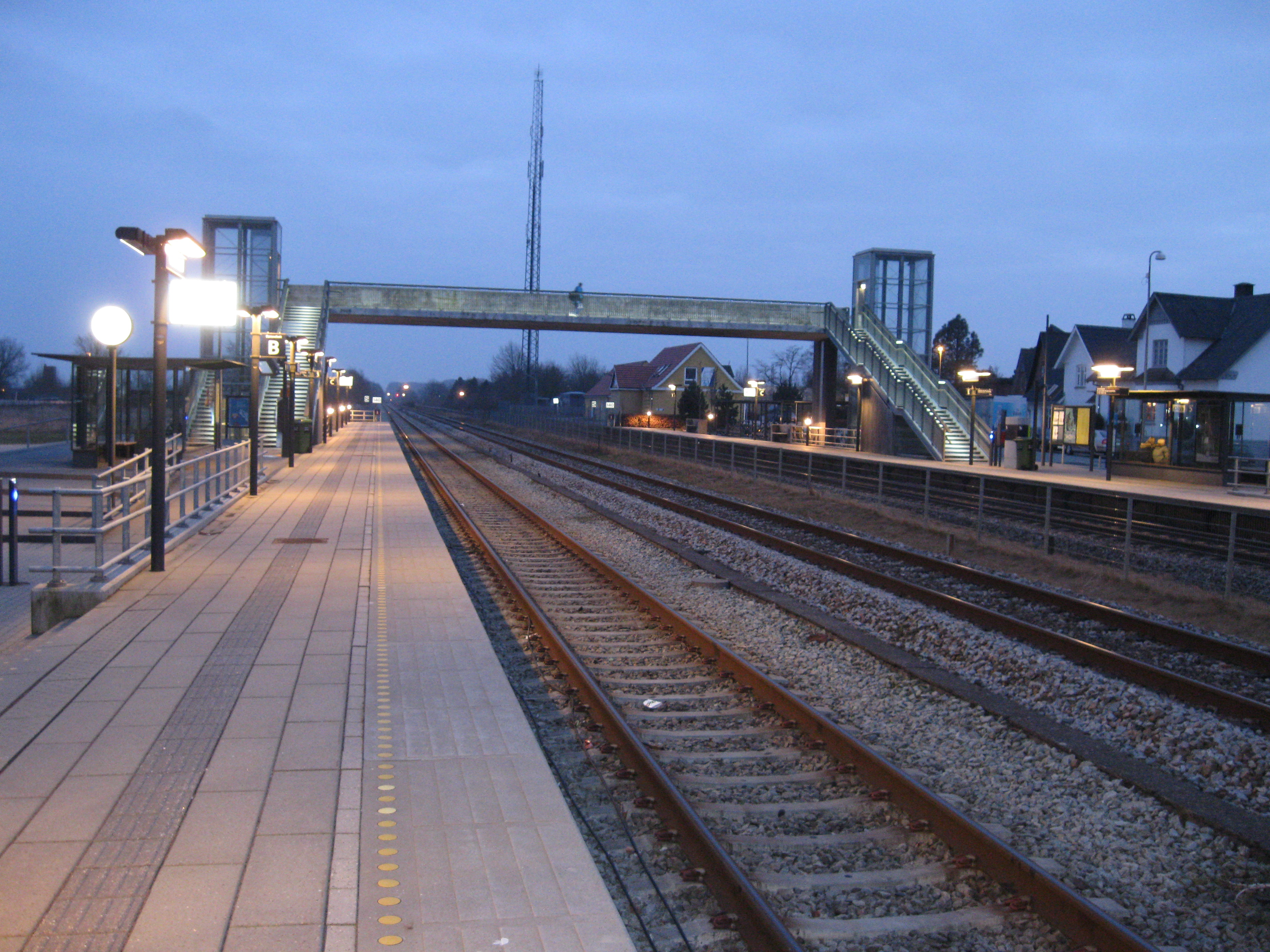
- Hedensted station in 2012

General information
- Location: Stationsvej 3; 8722 Hedensted; Hedensted Municipality; Denmark
- Coordinates: 55°46′07″N 09°41′56″E
- Elevation: 67.1 metres (220 ft)
- Owner: DSB (station infrastructure); Banedanmark (rail infrastructure)
- Line: Fredericia–Aarhus railway line
- Platforms: 2 side platforms
- Tracks: 2
- Train operators: DSB

History
- Opened: 4 October 1868; 8 January 2006
- Closed: 26 May 1974

Services
Preceding station	DSB	Following station
Vejle towards Fredericia	Fredericia-Aarhus Regional train	Horsens towards Aarhus Central
Location

Hedensted railway station is a railway station serving the railway town of Hedensted in East Jutland, Denmark.

The station is located on the Fredericia–Aarhus railway line from Fredericia to Aarhus. It opened in 1868, closed in 1974, but reopened in 2006. It offers direct regional train services to Aarhus and Fredericia. The train services are operated by the national railway company DSB.

== History ==
Hedensted station was opened on 3 October 1868 with the opening of the Fredericia–Aarhus railway line from Fredericia to Aarhus. It was closed on 26 May 1974, but the station reopened on 8 January 2006.

== Operations ==
The train services are operated by the national railway company DSB. The station offers regional train services to Aarhus and Fredericia.

== See also ==
- List of railway stations in Denmark
