= Hørning railway station =

Railway station in East Jutland, Denmark

Hørning
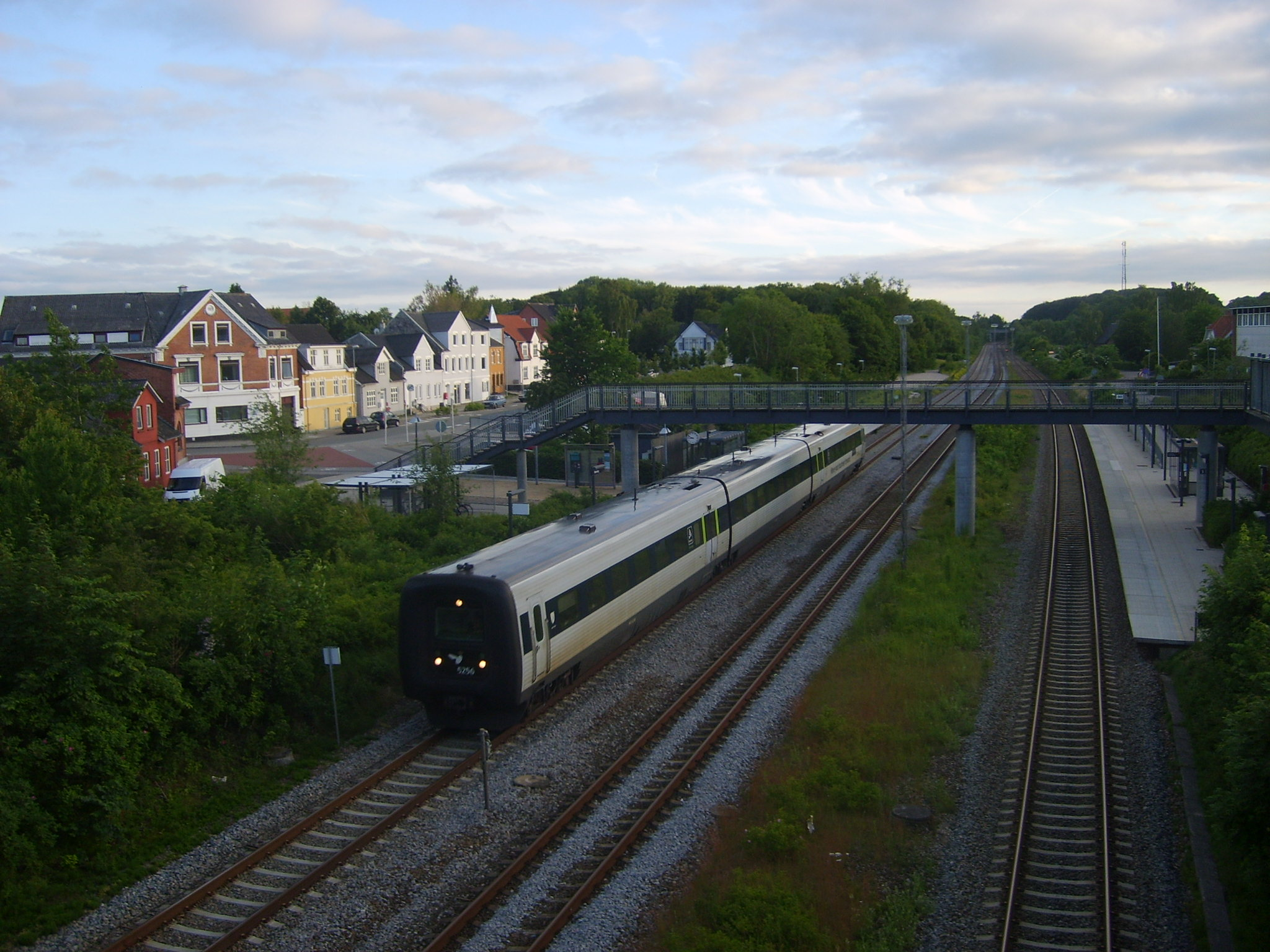
- Hørning station in 2010

General information
- Location: Stationspladsen 2; 8362 Hørning; Skanderborg Municipality; Denmark
- Coordinates: 56°4′56″N 10°2′16″E
- Elevation: 52.3 metres (172 ft)
- Owner: Banedanmark
- Line: Fredericia–Aarhus railway line
- Platforms: 2
- Tracks: 2
- Train operators: GoCollective

Services
Preceding station	GoCollective	Following station
Skanderborg towards Skjern	Aarhus–Skjern Regional train	Viby Jylland towards Aarhus Central
Location

Hørning station is a railway station serving the suburb of Hørning south of the city of Aarhus in East Jutland, Denmark.

The station is located on the Fredericia–Aarhus railway line from Fredericia to Aarhus. It offers regional train services to Aarhus, Esbjerg, Herning and Skjern. The train services are operated by the railway company GoCollective.

== See also ==
- List of railway stations in Denmark
