= Horsens railway station =

Railway station in East Jutland, Denmark

Horsens Station Horsens Banegård
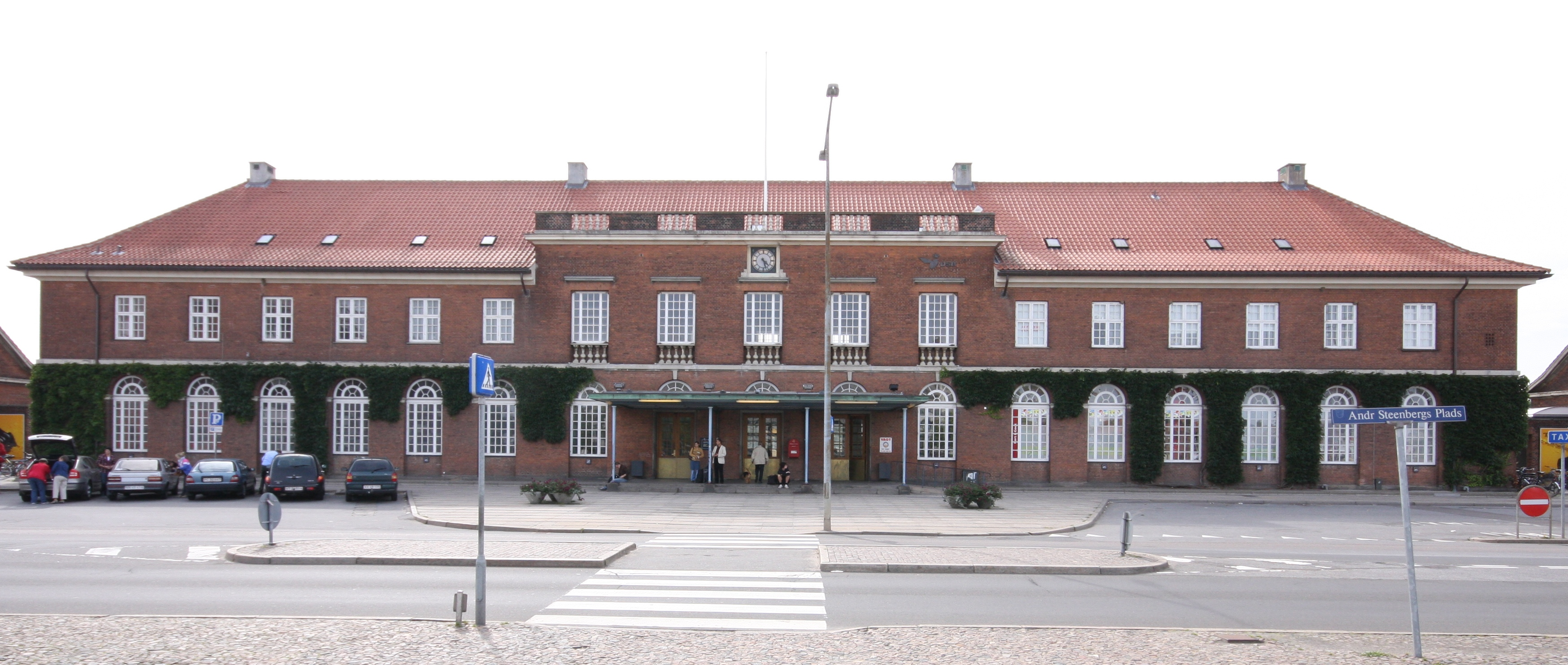
- Horsens station in 2008

General information
- Location: Banegårdsgade 3; 8700 Horsens; Horsens Municipality; Denmark
- Coordinates: 55°51′46″N 09°50′08″E
- Elevation: 2.7 metres (8 ft 10 in)
- System: railway station
- Owner: DSB (station infrastructure); Banedanmark (rail infrastructure)
- Line: Fredericia–Aarhus railway line
- Platforms: 2
- Tracks: 3
- Train operators: DSB

Construction
- Architect: Knud Tanggaard Seest (1929)

History
- Opened: 4 October 1868
- Rebuilt: 1929

Services
Preceding station	DSB	Following station
Vejle towards Copenhagen Airport	Copenhagen-Aalborg InterCityLyn	Skanderborg towards Aalborg Airport
Vejle towards Copenhagen Central	Copenhagen-Aalborg InterCity	Skanderborg towards Aalborg Airport
Vejle towards Esbjerg	Esbjerg–Aalborg InterCity	Skanderborg towards Aalborg
Hedensted towards Fredericia	Fredericia-Aarhus Regional train	Skanderborg towards Aarhus Central
Location
- Location within Denmark Location within Central Denmark Region

Horsens railway station (Danish: Horsens Station or Horsens Banegård) is a railway station serving the town of Horsens in East Jutland, Denmark.

The station is located on the Fredericia–Aarhus railway line from Fredericia to Aarhus. It offers direct InterCity services to Copenhagen, Hamburg, Aarhus and Aalborg as well as regional train services to Aarhus and Fredericia. The train services are operated by the railway company DSB.

The station opened in 1868 and was moved to its current position in 1929. Its second and current station building designed by the architect Knud Tanggaard Seest was inaugurated in 1929.

== History ==
Horsens station was opened in 1868 with the opening of the Fredericia–Aarhus railway line from Fredericia to Aarhus. In 1929, the station was moved to its current position.

== Architecture ==
The second and present station building from 1929 was designed by the Danish architect Knud Tanggaard Seest who was the head architect of the Danish State Railways from 1922 to 1949.

== Operations ==
The train services are operated by the railway company DSB. The station offers direct InterCity services to Copenhagen, Hamburg, Aarhus and Aalborg as well as regional train services to Aarhus and Fredericia.

== See also ==
- List of railway stations in Denmark
- Rail transport in Denmark
