= Skanderborg railway station =

Railway station in East Jutland, Denmark

Skanderborg
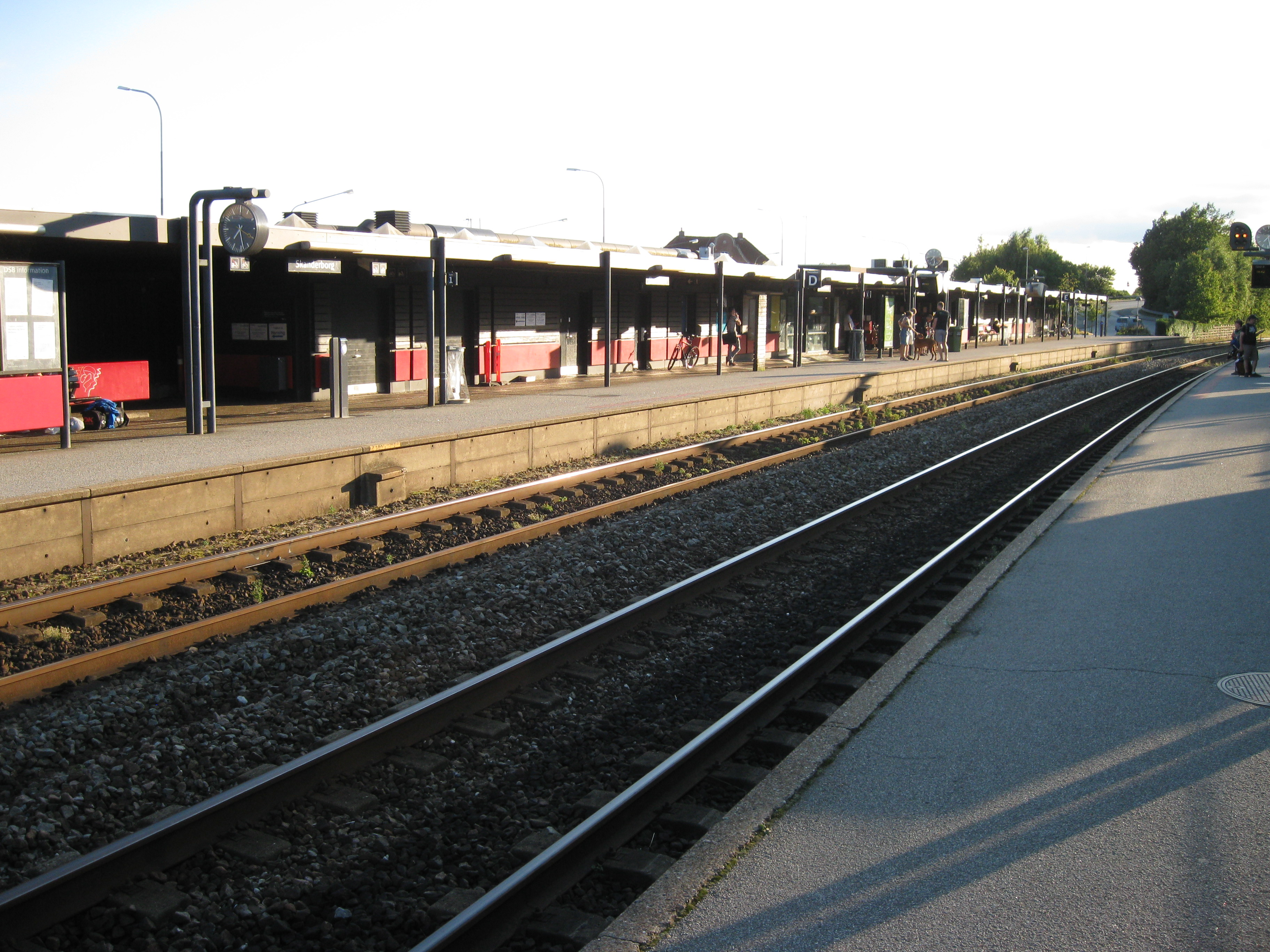
- Skanderborg station in 2012

General information
- Location: Jernbanevej 3; 8660 Skanderborg; Skanderborg Municipality; Denmark
- Coordinates: 56°2′35.59″N 09°55′29.26″E
- Elevation: 48.3 metres (158 ft)
- Owner: DSB (station infrastructure); Banedanmark (rail infrastructure)
- Lines: Fredericia–Aarhus railway line Skanderborg–Skjern railway line
- Platforms: 2
- Tracks: 3
- Train operators: DSB; GoCollective

Other information
- Fare zone: 78
- Website: Official website

History
- Opened: 4. Oktober 1868

Services
Preceding station	DSB	Following station
Horsens towards Copenhagen Airport	Copenhagen-Aalborg InterCityLyn	Aarhus Central towards Aalborg Airport
Horsens towards Copenhagen Central	Copenhagen-Aalborg InterCity	Viby Jylland towards Aalborg Airport
Horsens towards Esbjerg	Esbjerg–Aalborg InterCity	Aarhus Central towards Aalborg
Horsens towards Fredericia	Fredericia-Aarhus Regional train	Viby Jylland towards Aarhus Central
Preceding station	GoCollective	Following station
Alken towards Skjern	Aarhus–Skjern Regional train	Hørning towards Aarhus Central
Location

Skanderborg railway station (Danish: Skanderborg Station or Skanderborg Banegård) is a railway station serving the town of Skanderborg in East Jutland, Denmark.

The station is located on the Fredericia–Aarhus railway line from Fredericia to Aarhus and is the eastern terminus of the Skanderborg–Skjern railway line from Skanderborg to Skjern. It offers direct InterCity services to Copenhagen, Hamburg, Aarhus and Aalborg as well as regional train services to Aarhus, Fredericia, Esbjerg, Herning, Skjern and Struer. The train services are operated by DSB and GoCollective.

== History ==
Skanderborg station was opened in 1868 with the opening of the Fredericia–Aarhus railway line from Fredericia to Aarhus. In 1871, Skanderborg station also became the eastern terminus of the Skanderborg–Skjern railway line.

== Operations ==
The train services are operated by DSB and GoCollective. The station offers direct InterCity services to Copenhagen, Flensburg, Aarhus and Aalborg as well as regional train services to Aarhus, Fredericia, Esbjerg, Herning, Skjern and Struer.

== Cultural references ==
=== In literature ===
Skanderborg station is the setting for the famous poem Rejseminder by the Danish Neo-romantic poet Sophus Claussen (1865–1931). Published in 1899, the poem describes a meeting at Skanderborg station.

=== In music ===
The long-running Danish pop rock band TV-2 included a song titled På Skanderborg Station on their 1985 album Rigtige Mænd (Gider Ikke Høre Mere Vrøvl).

== See also ==
- List of railway stations in Denmark
- Rail transport in Denmark
- History of rail transport in Denmark
