= Aarhus Commuter Rail =

Railway line in Denmark

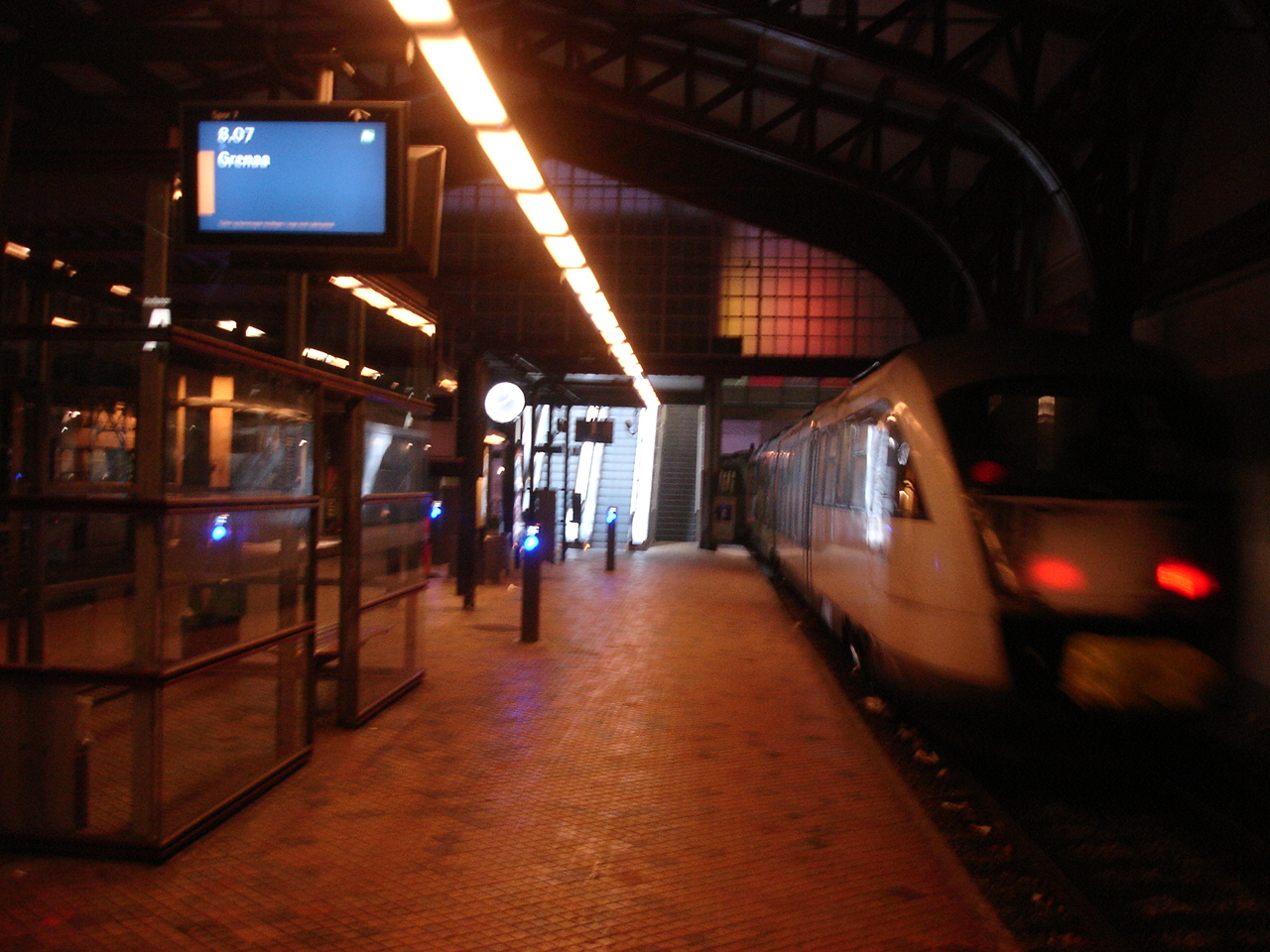

Overview
- Owner: Rail Net Danmark; Midtjyske Jernbaner
- Locale: Region Midtjylland, Denmark
- Transit type: Commuter rail
- Number of lines: 1
- Number of stations: 33

Operation
- Began operation: 2012
- Ended operation: 2016
- Operator: Danish State Railways

Technical
- Track gauge: 1,435 mm (4 ft 8 1/2 in)

Aarhus Commuter Rail (Danish: Aarhus Nærbane) was a commuter rail service in and near Aarhus, Denmark.

There was one line, from Odder to Grenaa, with 33 stations. This traffic concept started in 2012, when the traffic on the two local railways Odderbanen and Grenaabanen was combined into one line, with new rolling stock. The rolling stock was Siemens Desiro diesel multiple units.

The line closed in August 2016 for electrification and conversion to light rail service.

On 21 December 2017, the railway was finished repurposing for light rail service. It opened with one line running from Aarhus Central Station to Skejby University Hospital. This is now called the Aarhus Letbane (Aarhus light rail).

== See also ==
- List of commuter rail systems
