= HHJ =

HHJ may refer to:

- His/Her Honour Judge, an honorific prefix
- Odder Line, a Danish rail line formerly known as Hads-Ning Herreders Jernbane
