= Viby =

Viby or VIBY may refer to:

- Viby, Kristianstad, a village in Kristianstad Municipality, Sweden
- Viby, Sollentuna, part of Sollentuna Municipality, Sweden
- Viby, Närke, a village in Närke and parish of the diocese of Strängnäs, Sweden
- Viby J, a town in Jutland, Denmark
  - Viby J station, a railway station
- Viby Sj, a town on the island of Zealand, Denmark
- Viby, Kerteminde, a town in Kerteminde, Denmark
- Marguerite Viby, a Danish actress
- Bareilly Airport (ICAO code VIBY), a domestic airport in Uttar Pradesh, India

== See also ==
- Visby
