= Morten Ring Christensen =

Norwegian freestyle athlete (born 1990)

Morten Ring Christensen (born 9 November 1990) is a Norwegian-Danish freestyle athlete who is competes in the sport Skicross. He represents IL Trysilgutten. He lives in Trysil Municipality, Norway and is a member of the Norwegian Skicross Worldcup Team.

He missed the 2010 Vancouver Olympics due to his diagnosis of Hodgkin's lymphoma.

== Early life ==
Born in Odder, Denmark. He lived in Skanderborg, Denmark, until the age of 7 when him and his family moved to Trysil Municipality, Norway.

== Skiing career ==
Former alpine ski racer in the top of his age class and converted to Skicross before the 2009 season. Ranked as the world's best Junior Skicross racer. Has 5 National championships titles, including 1 in the Senior class and 4 in the Junior.

== Cancer ==
Christensen was diagnosed with Hodgkin's lymphoma in the end of August 2009. He was undergoing radiation treatment for some time, and was given an OK by the doctors to start training again in the end of December 2009.
