= Odder RK =

- Full name: Odder Rugby Klub
- Founded: 1996
- Location: Odder, Denmark
- Ground: Spektrum Rugby Park
- President: (England) Michael Batchelor
- Coach: Dennis Graversen
- League: DRU Division One East
Team kit

Odder RK is a Danish rugby club in Odder. They currently play in DRU Division One East. The clubs forms part of the Odder Idræts- og Gymnastik Forening (Odder Sports and Gymnastics Club).

== History ==
The club was founded in 1996.
