= Hinnerup railway station =

Railway station in East Jutland, Denmark

Hinnerup
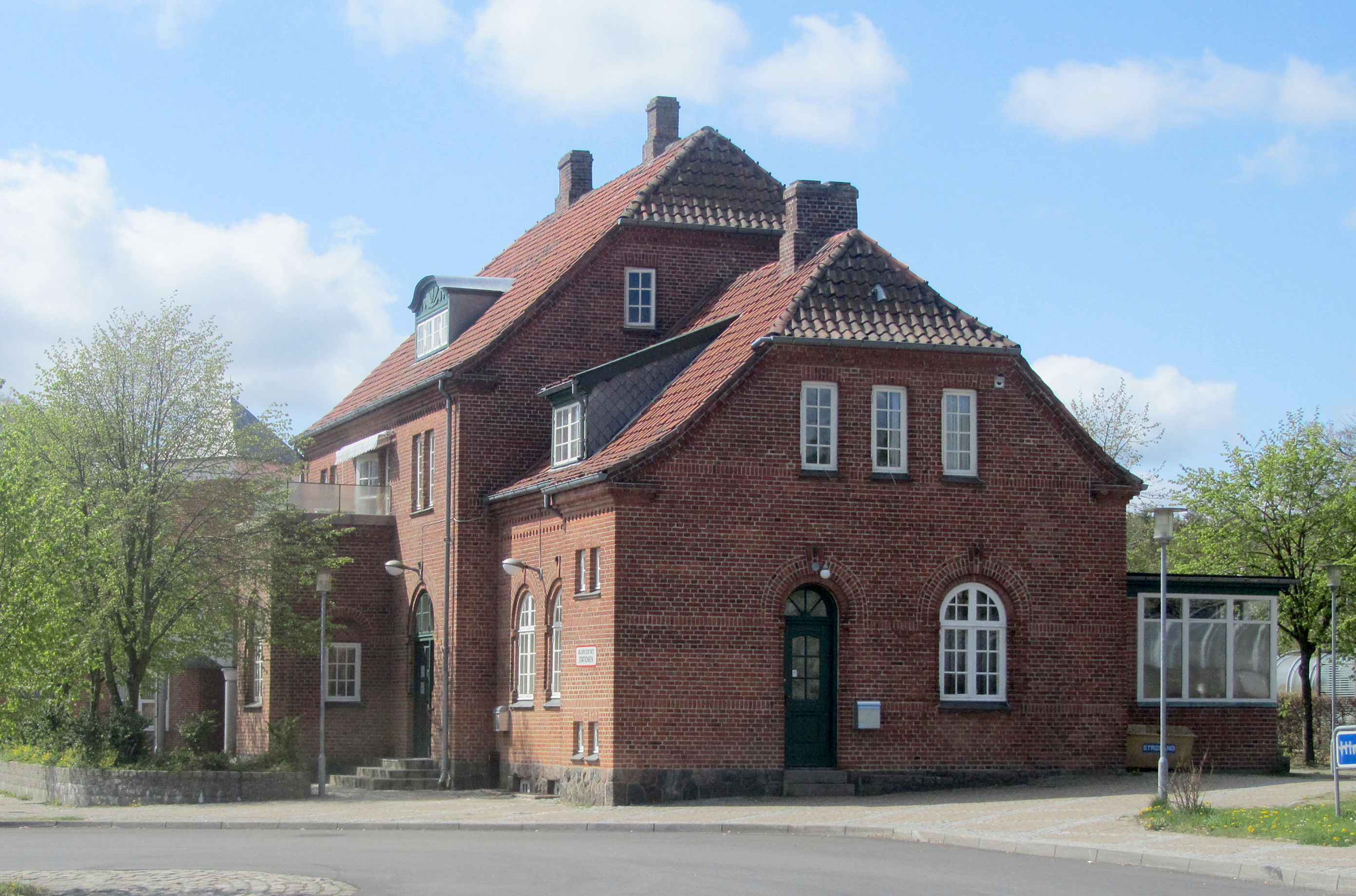
- Hinnerup station in 2012

General information
- Location: Skovvej 18; 8382 Hinnerup; Favrskov Municipality; Denmark
- Coordinates: 56°15′47″N 10°3′34.5″E
- Elevation: 32.0 metres (105.0 ft)
- Owner: DSB (station infrastructure); Banedanmark (rail infrastructure)
- Line: Aarhus–Randers railway line
- Platforms: 2
- Tracks: 2
- Train operators: DSB

Other information
- Fare zone: 25

History
- Opened: 1862

Services
Preceding station	DSB Vores Tog	Following station
Århus H Terminus	Aarhus–Struer Regional train	Hadsten towards Struer
Location

Hinnerup station is a railway station serving the railway town of Hinnerup in East Jutland, Denmark.

The station is located on the Aarhus-Randers Line from Aarhus to Randers. It offers direct regional train services to Aarhus and Struer. The train services are operated by the national train operating company DSB.

== History ==
Hinnerup station was opened in 1862 with the opening of the Aarhus-Randers railway line from Aarhus to Randers. It was closed in 1979, but the station reopened in 1994.

== Operations ==
The station offers direct regional train services to Aarhus and Struer. The train services are operated by the national train operating company DSB.

== See also ==
- List of railway stations in Denmark
- Rail transport in Denmark
