= Odder Line =

Railway line in Denmark

Coordinates: 55.9699292°N 10.1508654°E

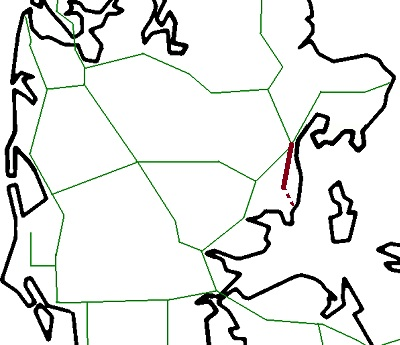

Overview
- Termini: Odder station; Aarhus Central Station
- Stations: 18

Service
- Operator(s): Midttrafik

Technical
- Number of tracks: Single
- Track gauge: 1,435 mm (4 ft 8 1/2 in)
- Electrification: 750 V DC

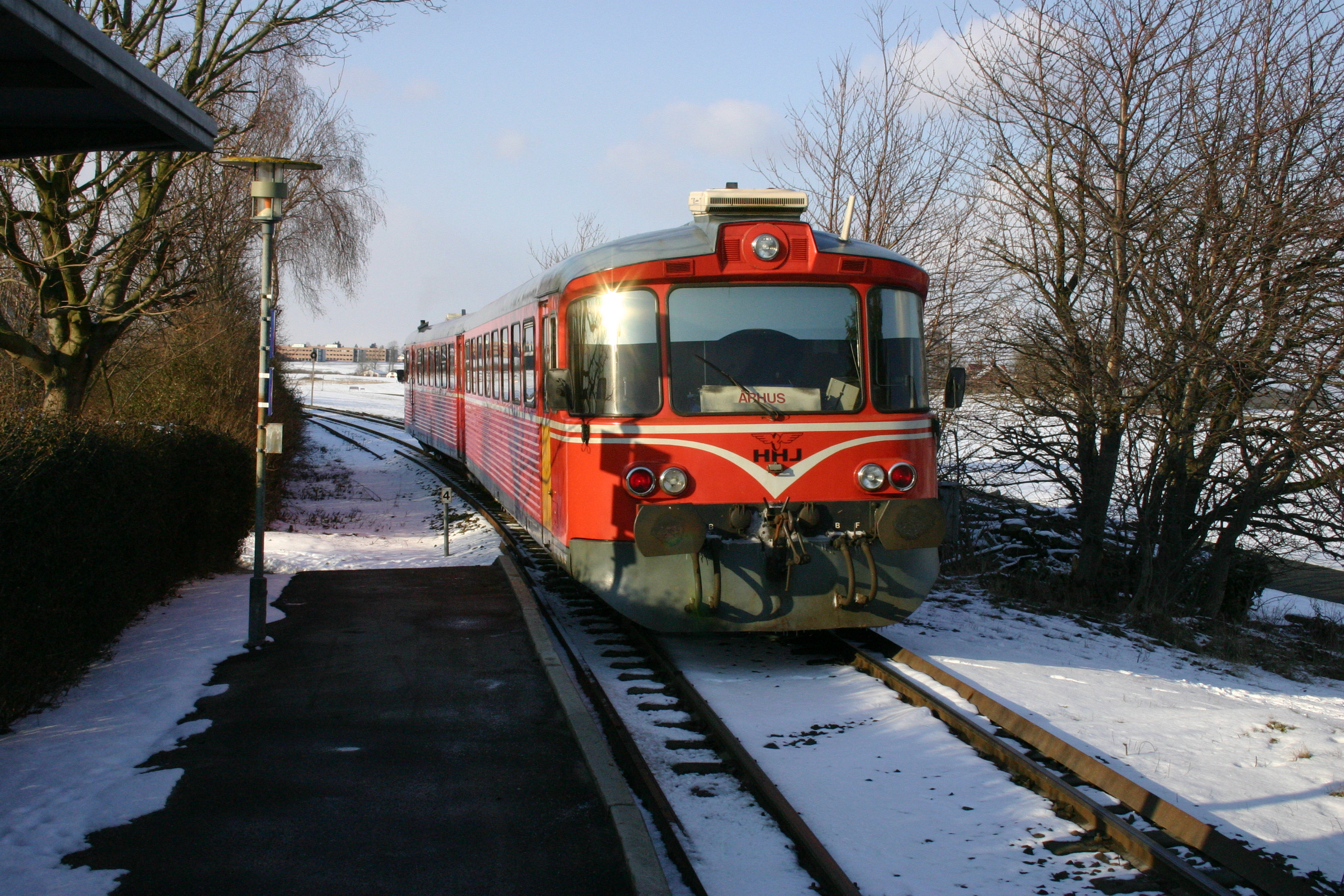
2006: A Lynette diesel railcar unit at Gunnestrup halt in the heavy-rail era

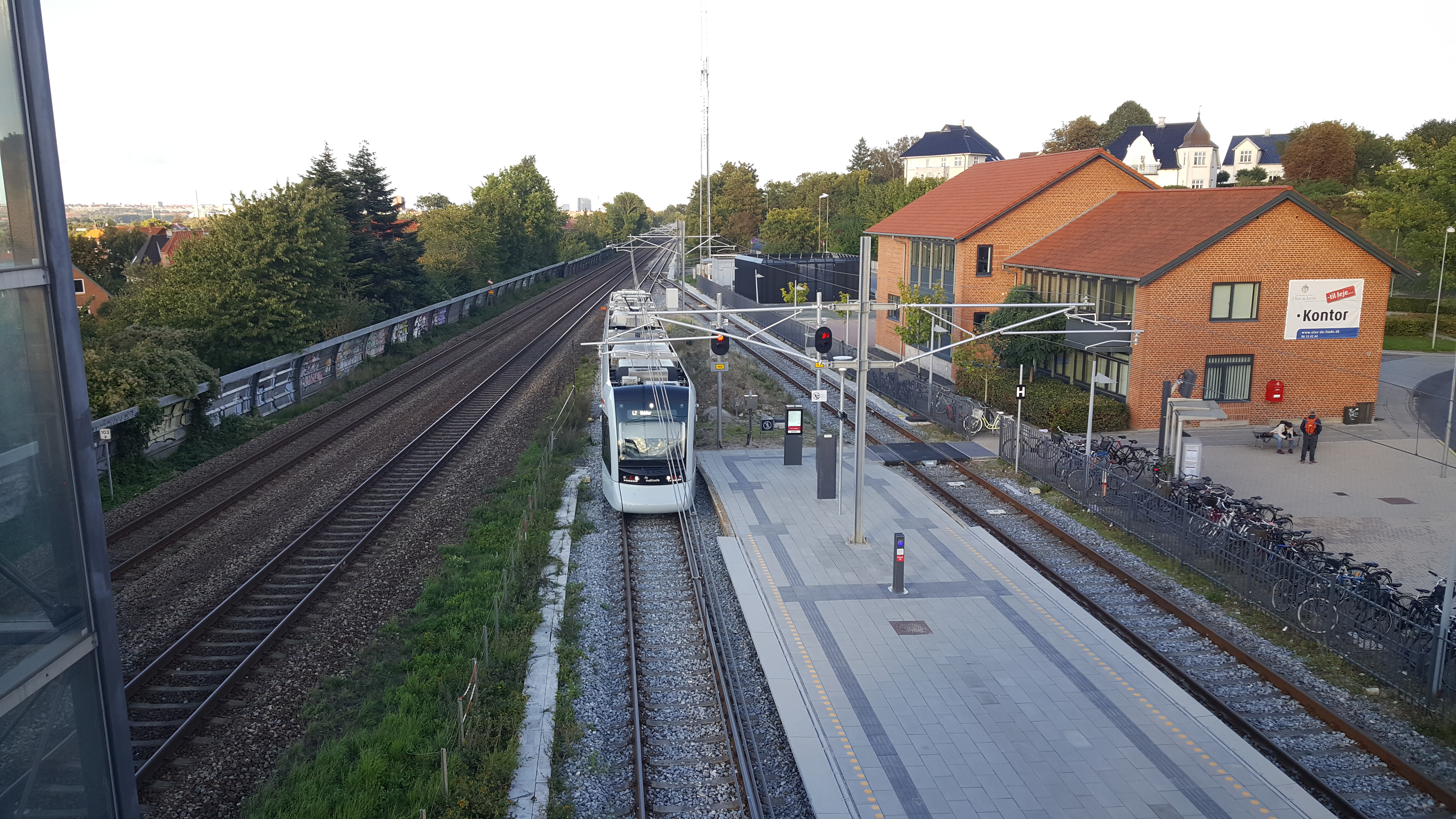
2018: A tram-train at Viby J station

The Odder Line (Danish: Odderbanen), also known formerly as the Hads-Ning Herreders Jernbane (HHJ), is a 26.5 km (16.5 mi) long standard-gauge single-track light-rail line which connects the city of Aarhus to the town of Odder in the Central Denmark Region. The Odder Line has its own route between Rosenhøj and Odder, and parallels the mainline between Rosenhøj and Aarhus.

The line, first opened in 1884, was originally operated by the HHJ, which merged with the Lemvig Line (VLTJ) in 2008 to form Midtjyske Jernbaner. From 2012 to 2016 services on the line were operated by DSB as part of Aarhus Nærbane (Aarhus Commuter Rail).

The line was rebuilt in 2016–2018 to convert it into an electrified Aarhus Letbane (Aarhus Light Rail) route, operated by Midttrafik, with new tram-trains entering service in August 2018.

== See also ==
- List of railway lines in Denmark
- Rail transport in Denmark
