= Aarhus Business College =

Business school in Aarhus, Denmark

Coordinates: 56.120579°N 10.159059°E

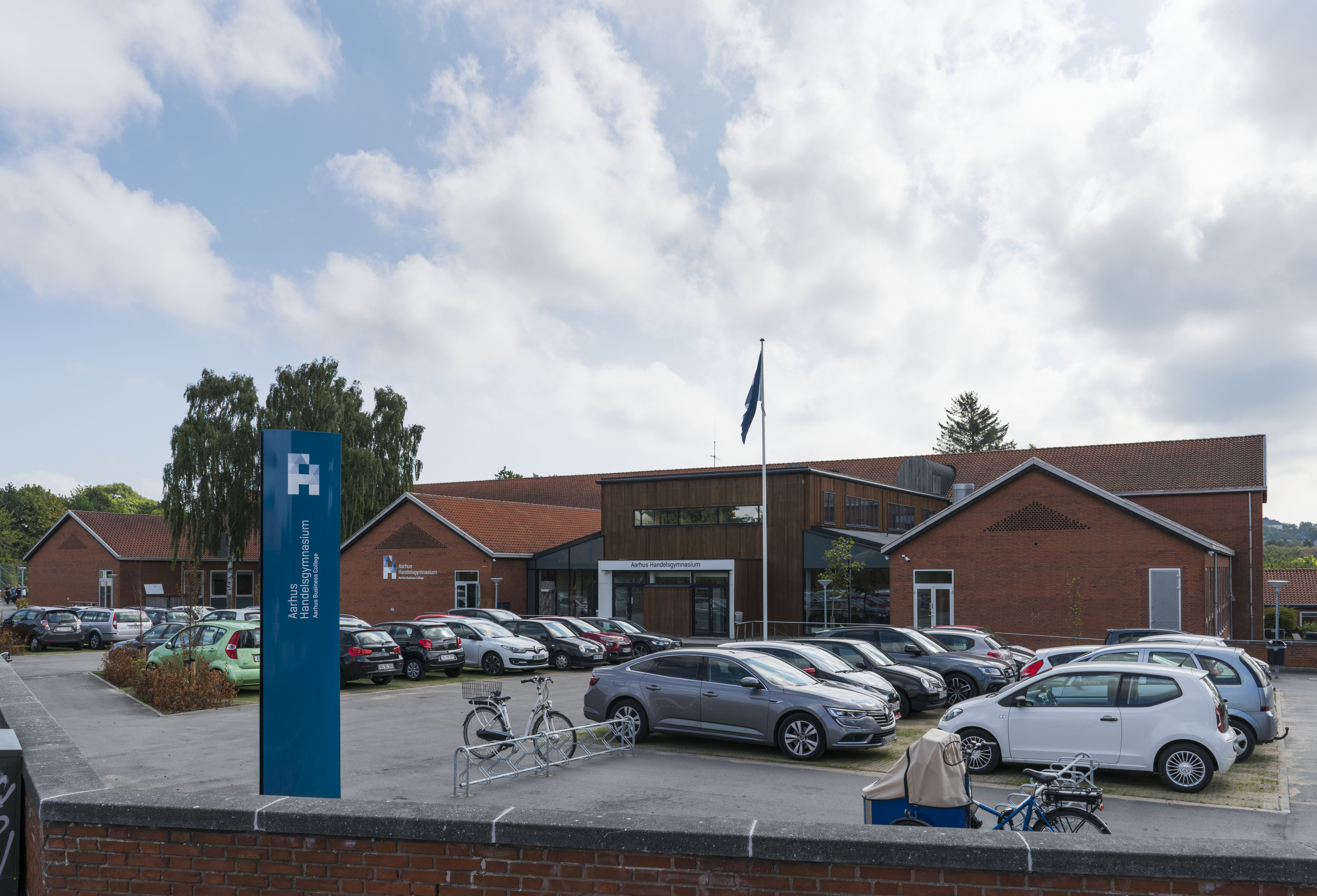
- Aarhus Business College (Viby department)
- Type: Secondary education
- Established: 1865
- Director: Gitte Nørgaard
- Administrative staff: ca. 350
- Students: ca. 3.200 (2017)
- Location: Aarhus, Denmark
- Website: https://www.aabc.dk/

Aarhus Business College is a business school of secondary education in Aarhus, Denmark. The school offers educational programmes in business and management on a secondary level to post-primary youth, Higher Commercial Examination Programme (HHX) and supplementary courses for adults seeking to maintain qualifications. Last but not least Aarhus Business College has two new types of educations called EUX Business and EUD Business. EUX is an education that combines a 2-year secondary education with a 2-year internship in a company, and EUD is 1 year in school and a 2-year internship in a company. It is an independent self-owned institution under the Danish government, managed by a board composed of members from the business community in conjunction with a rector that oversees day-to-day operations. The school is located on three addresses in Aarhus: Campus Sønderhøj in Viby J (EUX Business, EUD Business, EUD10 Business and supplementary courses) and the two campuses of HHX in Risskov and Viby J.

== Background ==
Aarhus Business College was founded in 1865 under the name Aarhus Handelsforenings Aftenskole (English: The Aarhus Business Association Evening School). The Business Association had been established one year prior and its members had realized the need for education of businessmen and other traders and had started planning the school in 1864 with the first 36 students beginning in 1865. In 1905 The Business Folk High School of Jutland, designed by Hack Kampmann, was established and in 1956 the Business High School was spun off as an independent institution and moved to a different location and Folk High School changed its name to Århus Købmandsskole (Aarhus Business College).

The school has grown substantially since its beginning and today occupy three locations across the city, and all of them has been expanded over the years. In 2009, Business Academy Aarhus was spun off as an independent institution along with vocational programmes under Aarhus Educational Centre for Agriculture and Aarhus Tech.
