= Euractiv Video =

Euractiv Video is a formerly independent digital multilingual television station that covers European Union (EU) policy news from Brussels. The channel is based in the International Press Centre in Brussels. It was created as EUX.TV in 2006 by business journalist Raymond Frenken, former EU Correspondent for CNBC Europe and former Amsterdam bureau chief for Bloomberg News.

Euractiv Video's main diffusion methods are via its website and via YouTube. It serves a daily online menu of news videos, interviews and reportage. The channel reached 10 million views on YouTube in January 2011.

Since May 2010, EUX.TV has been a service provided by EurActiv EUX.TV Video SPRL, a Belgian joint company specializing in online video production for the European-policy community in Brussels. Event videos and policy videos are its main production services. In 2012 the name of the channel was changed to EurActiv Video.

Euractiv is an independent online network dedicated to EU policy, counting 590,000 monthly unique visitors.
