= Rosenhøj =

- Neighborhood
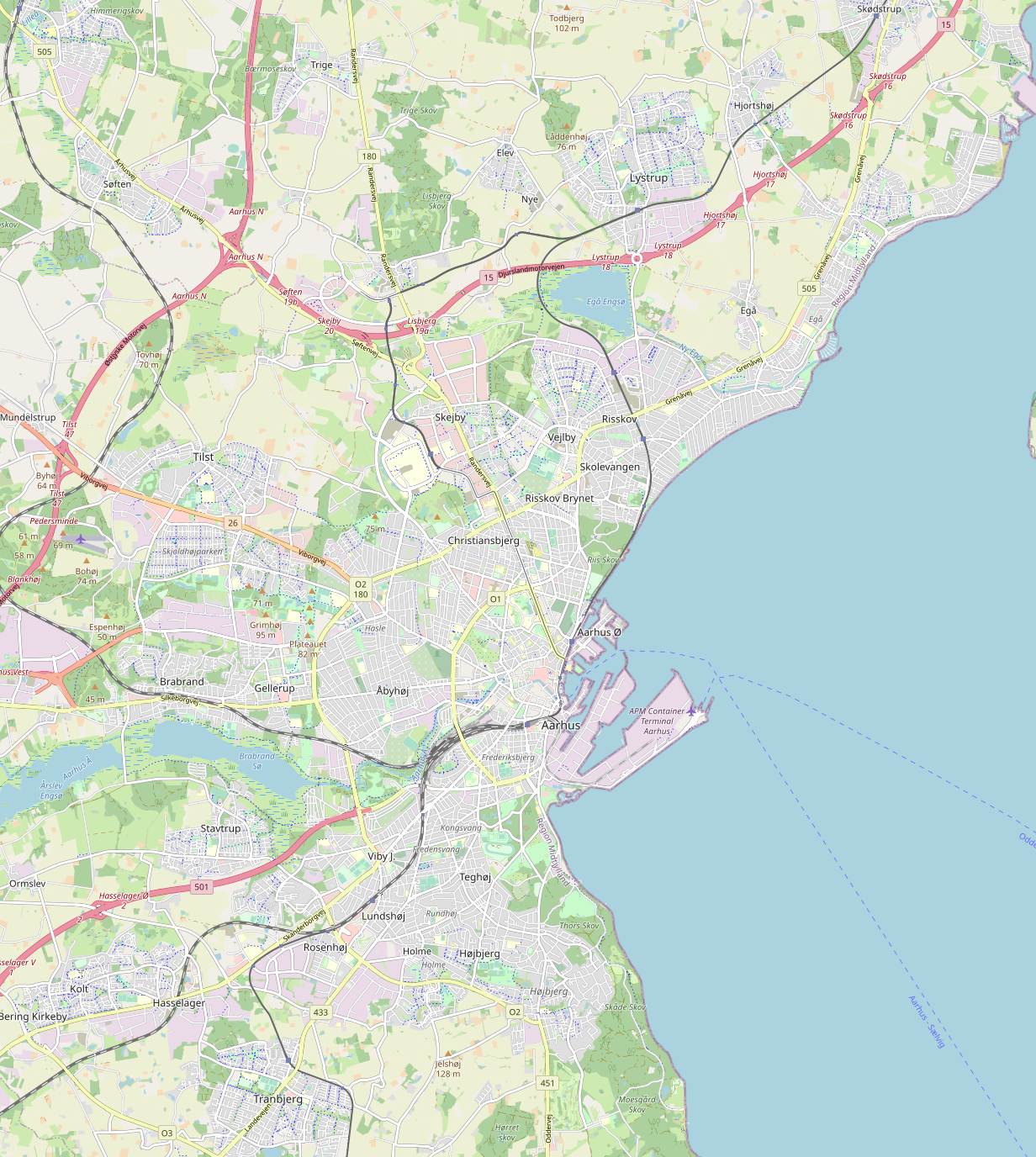
- Location within Aarhus
- Coordinates: 56.114840°N 10.147426°E
- Country: Kingdom of Denmark
- Regions of Denmark: Central Denmark Region
- Municipality: Aarhus Municipality
- District: Viby
- Postal code: 8260

Rosenhøj (lit.: Rose-hill) is a public housing project in Viby J, a southern district of Aarhus, Denmark.

Rosenhøj consists of concrete apartment blocks, with a total of 808 rentals, built in 1967-70. The area underwent a thorough renovation in 2014-17, updating the buildings to contemporary climate regulations, and also adding 22 new rowhouse rentals and outdoor sports facilities among other improvements.

In the 2000s, Rosenhøj has been increasingly attractive to immigrants. In 2001, 22% of the inhabitants where immigrants; in 2008 more than 52% where immigrants. Nearly all of the inhabitants under the age of 18 has an immigrant background. The majority of immigrants in Rosenhøj comes from Afghanistan, Somalia and Turkey.

Preceding station	Aarhus Letbane	Following station
Øllegårdsvej towards Odder	Line 2	Viby J towards Lisbjergskolen or Lystrup
