= Viby J =

Viby
- District
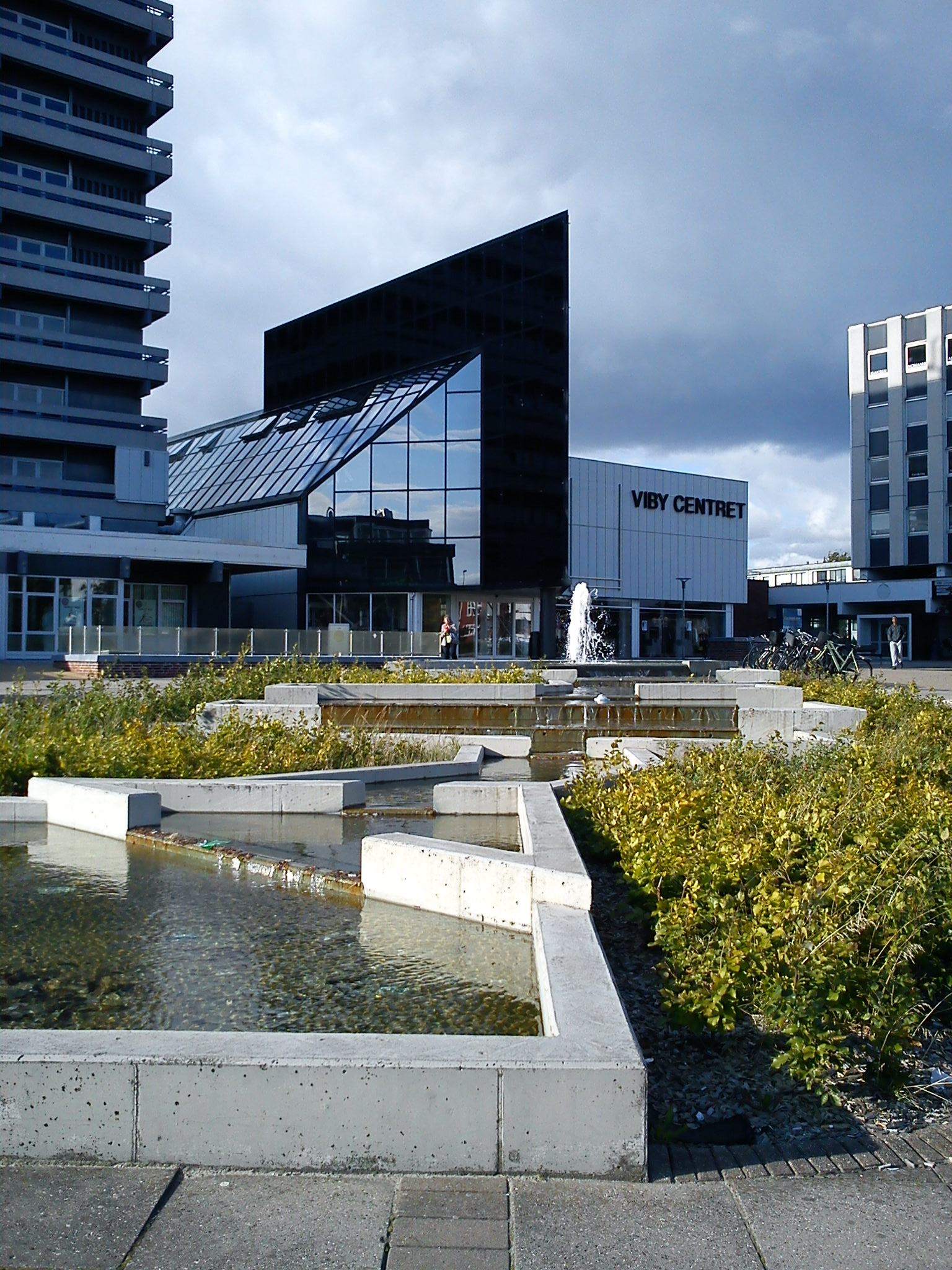
- Viby Square

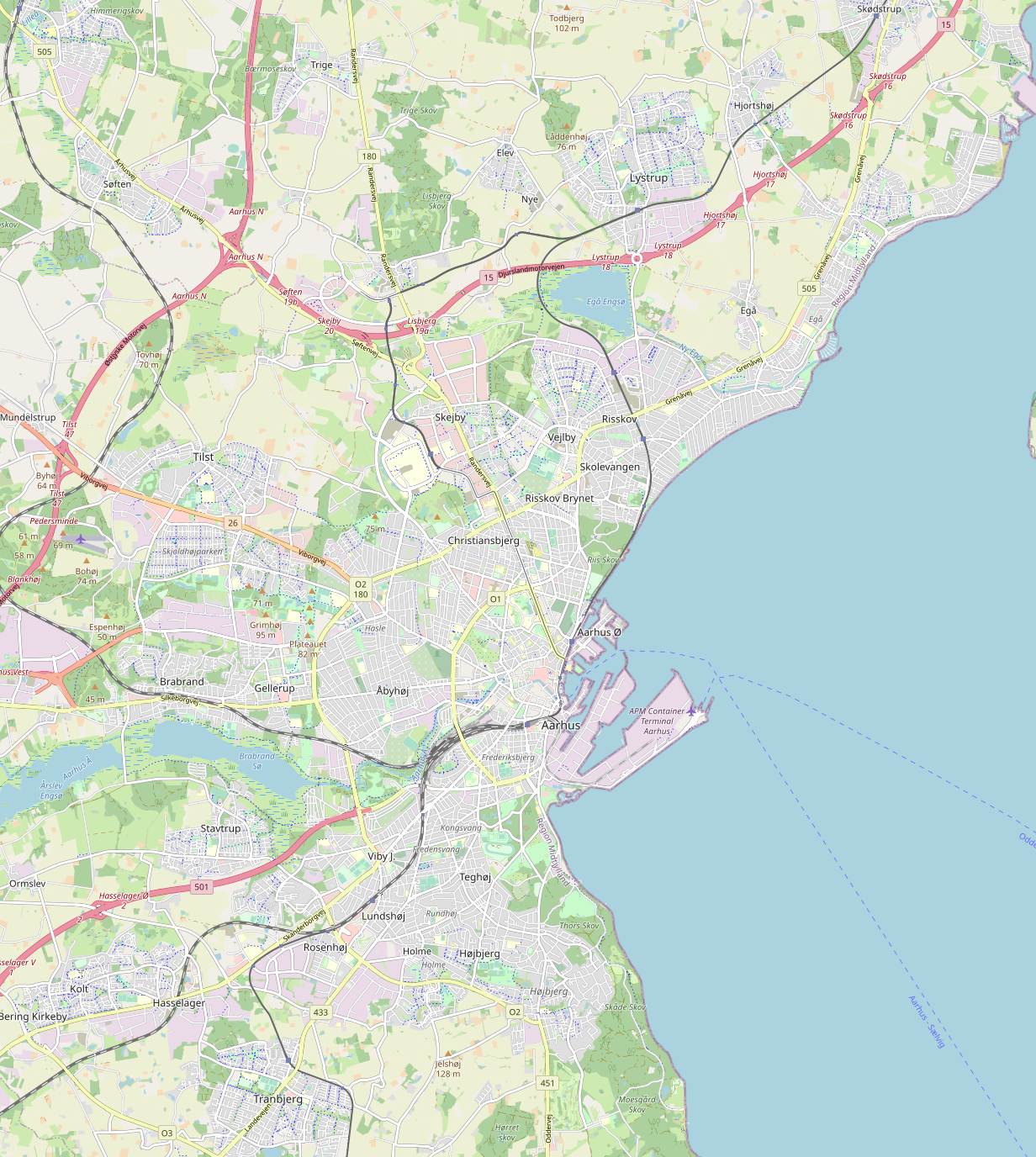
- Location within Aarhus
- Coordinates: 56.122096°N 10.147069°E
- Country: Kingdom of Denmark
- Regions of Denmark: Central Denmark Region
- Municipality: Aarhus Municipality
- District: Viby
- Foundation: pre-history (unknown)
- Railway town: 1884 (Odderbanen)
- Part of Aarhus Municipality: 1970
- Postal code: 8260

Viby J (or just Viby) is a former town and now a district, in the southwestern part of Aarhus in Denmark. The district has almost 30,000 inhabitants. The "J" stands for Jutland, as there is another town called Viby on the island of Zealand, officially referred to as Viby Sj and also a village on Funen.

== Etymology and origin ==
Viby derives from the Old Norse words vé and býr, meaning holy place and town respectively.

Vi is a word represented in many place names in both Denmark and Sweden. Several places are named Viby in both Denmark and Sweden (see Viby (disambiguation) for examples) and vi is also present in names like Viborg or the Swedish towns of Odensvi, Torsvi, Frösvi, Ullavi or Visby. Vi refers to "an enclosed holy place", and it is believed that Viby was once a holy place where the Norse gods were worshipped, with one or several cult houses. The shrines were probably located at what was formerly known as Tyrseng - the area around the large association football fields in the southwest of Viby. The name Tyrseng translates as "Tyrs-meadow", referring to the Norse god Tyr. These theories are backed up by other more or less sound evidence. In 1915, remains of an old hall dating from the Viking Age, was unearthed at the hill of Kongsbakke (lit.: kings-hill), when the public school of Viby Skole was constructed. Medieval sources explains, that the hill of Kongsbakke was once the site of a royal estate in ancient times. Our general research-based knowledge of the Norse culture in the Iron Age and Viking Age tells us, that kings and magnates settled near vis and hofs, as they also worked as priests of the Norse religion and were needed there to attend the rituals. Archaeological excavations conducted by Moesgård Museum at a motorway junction in Viby, has also revealed a former holy spring, a chapel and a cemetery used from the 11th century to around 1200.

== Description ==
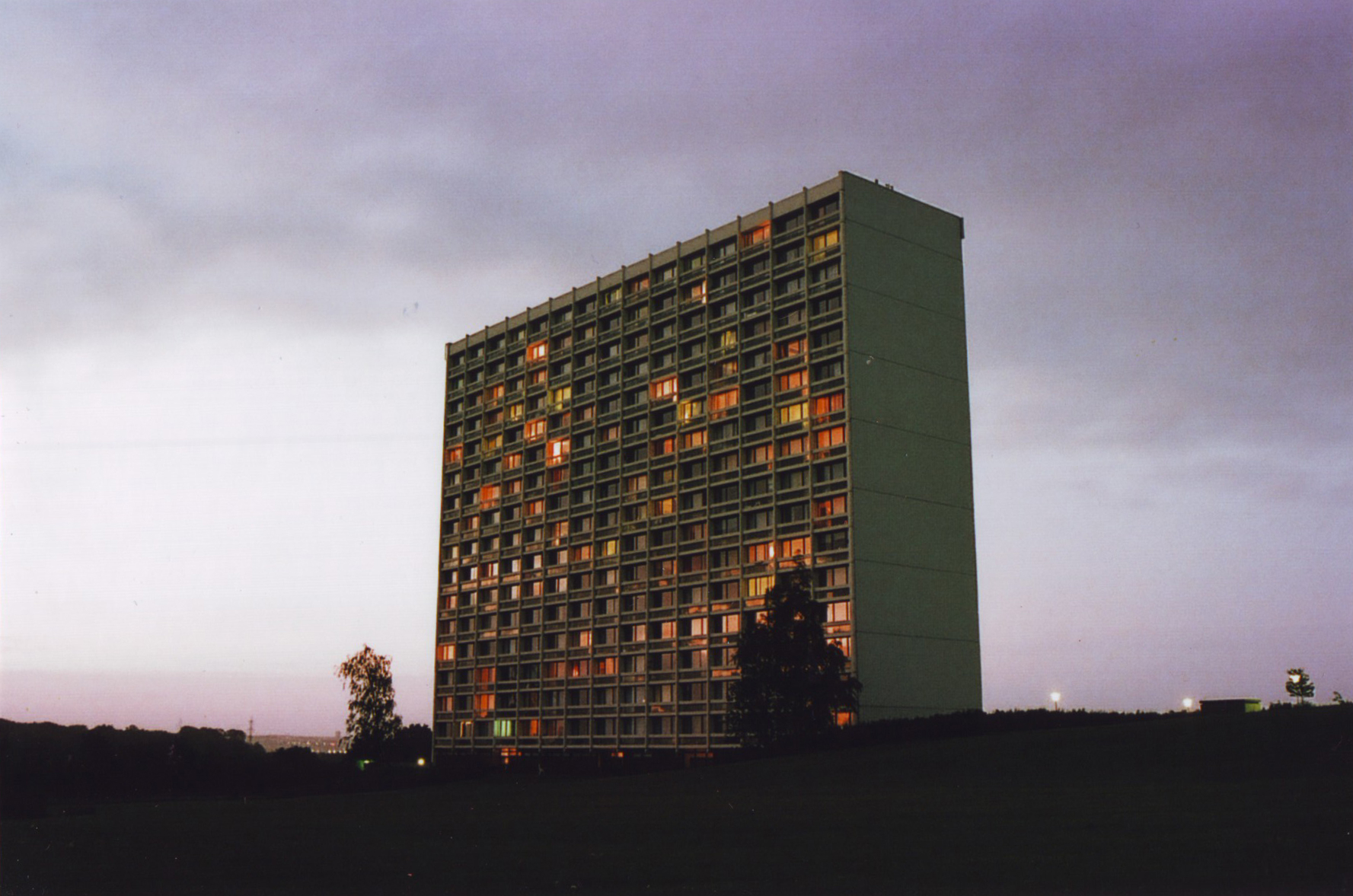
The landmark high-rise of Grøfthøjhuset in Viby.

Apart from the former suburban town of Viby J, the postal district also includes the neighbourhoods of Kongsvang and Stavtrup

Viby J is primarily a working-class neighbourhood, including many immigrants, but the area also presents large boroughs of detached family houses for the upper-middle class. There are several educational institutions here, such as Viby Gymnasium and Aarhus Business College, making it a centre of education for its part of the city. Two major public housing projects are located in Viby J. Rosenhøj is made up by low-rise apartment blocks, while Grøfthøjparken comprise row house quarters, low-rise apartment blocks 4–6 stories tall and the landmark high-rise block of Grøfthøjhuset, with 17 floors and 51 meters tall. It is also the 6th tallest building in greater Aarhus.

The urban square of Viby Torv, is one of Aarhus' southernmost traffic nodes, joining the international E45 motorway with the Ring 2 ring road. There is a shopping centre at the square by the name of Viby Centret, including parking lots, a high-rise hotel and several office buildings and businesses.

Viby J houses the main editorial office of Jyllands-Posten.

=== Sports ===
Viby is known for its taekwondo-club, which has fostered several European Champions.

== History ==
In the Viking Age and early Middle Ages there might have been a royal residence in Viby.

Viby Church was finished in the later part of the 1100s.

Viby J became a railway town in 1884.

The 1960s marked the beginning of large scale urban development projects in Viby. The expansions were intended to increase the population from 16,000 to 50,000. In early July 1961, Århus Stiftstidende could announce that:

- 100 acres (40 ha) of land were to be designated for industry;
- 1800 new flats were to be built;
- The centre would be freshened up to include a 10 storeys tall hotel, and a shopping centre;
- Two new schools and a church would be constructed;
- Road expansions would be made.

In 1970, a municipality reform made Viby a part of Aarhus and the Viby Centret shopping centre was finished. The centre project ended up costing about £4 million, instead of the originally estimated £1.85 million.

== See also ==
Other postal districts in Aarhus includes:

- Højbjerg
- Brabrand
- Aarhus C
- Aarhus V
- Aarhus N
