= Aarhus Central Station =

Main railway station in Aarhus, Denmark

Aarhus H
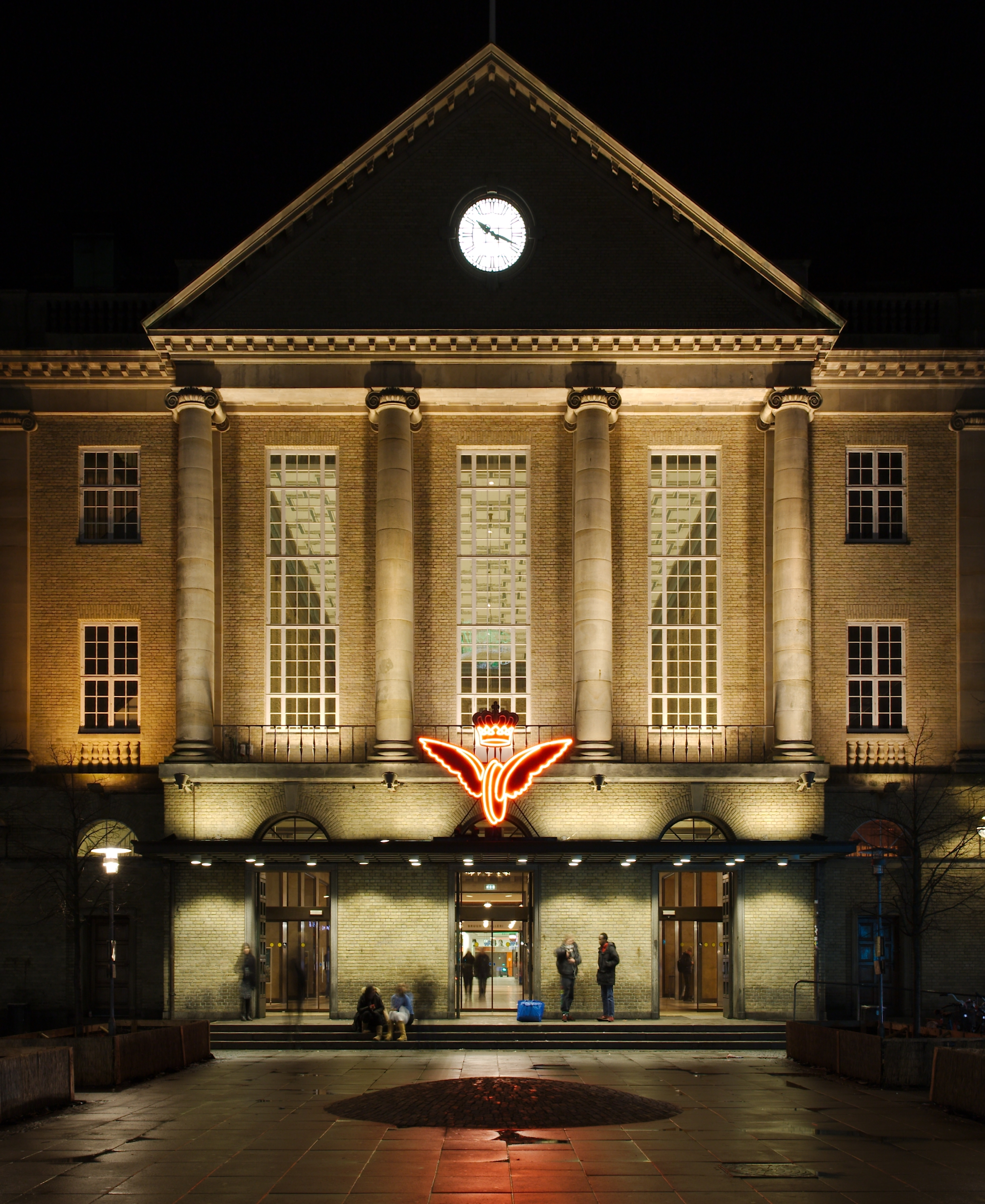
- Front facade of Aarhus Central Station by night

General information
- Location: Banegårdspladsen 1D; Aarhus C Aarhus Municipality; Denmark
- Coordinates: 56°09′00″N 10°12′17″E
- Elevation: 11.5 metres (38 ft)
- Owner: DSB (station infrastructure); Banedanmark (rail infrastructure)
- Lines: Fredericia-Aarhus Line; Aarhus-Randers Line; Odder Line; Grenaa Line
- Platforms: 4
- Tracks: 8
- Train operators: DSB; Midttrafik

Other information
- Fare zone: 01

History
- Opened: 1862
- Rebuilt: July 1929
Services
Preceding station	DSB	Following station
Skanderborg towards Copenhagen Airport	Copenhagen-Aalborg InterCityLyn	Randers towards Aalborg Airport
Viby Jylland towards Copenhagen Central	Copenhagen-Aalborg InterCity	Hadsten towards Aalborg Airport
Skanderborg towards Esbjerg	Esbjerg–Aalborg InterCity	Hadsten towards Aalborg
Viby Jylland towards Fredericia	Fredericia-Aarhus Regional train	Terminus
Viby Jylland towards Esbjerg	Esbjerg-Aarhus Regional train	Terminus
Terminus	Aarhus–Aalborg Regional train	Langå towards Aalborg
Preceding station	DSB Vores Tog	Following station
Viby Jylland towards Skjern	Aarhus–Skjern Regional train	Terminus
Terminus	Aarhus–Struer Regional train	Hinnerup towards Struer
Preceding station	Aarhus Letbane	Following station
Kongsvang towards Odder or Mårslet	Line 1	Dokk1 towards Grenaa or Hornslet
Kongsvang towards Odder	Line 2	Dokk1 towards Lisbjergskolen or Lystrup
Location

Aarhus Central Station (Danish: Aarhus Hovedbanegård, abbreviated Aarhus H) is the main railway station serving the city of Aarhus, Denmark. Serving as the main connecting hub for rail traffic between Aarhus and the rest of Denmark, the station is used by an average of 6.3 million people per year, making it the busiest station in Denmark outside the Copenhagen area. It is located in the city centre between the districts of Midtbyen and Frederiksbjerg with entrances from Banegårdspladsen and the shopping centre Bruun's Galleri, and with access to platforms from M.P. Bruuns Gade.

It is a through station with 4 platforms. The station is located on the East Jutland railway, and is the terminus of the Grenaa Line and Odder Line. It offers international connections to Hamburg and Berlin, InterCity connections to Aalborg/Frederikshavn and Copenhagen, regional connections to the rest of Jutland as well as light rail services to Grenå and Odder. The train services are operated by the national railway company DSB.

== History ==
The Danish railway network reached Aarhus in 1862 with the construction of the railway line from Aarhus to Randers, built by the British civil engineering company Peto, Brassey and Betts. The city's first railway station opened on 2 September 1862 to serve as the southern terminus of this new line. It was located near Ryesgade, and encompassed administration buildings and railway works.

In 1884, a new and larger station building was constructed. The second station was built in Neo-Renaissance style by Thomas Arboe and William August Thulstrup and was possibly inspired by Bonn Central Station.

However, also this building turned out to be to small for the quickly developing city. The third and current Aarhus Central Station was built in 1927 by the Danish State Railway's architect Knud Tanggaard Seest as a part of a plan of the whole area around the station.

== Station facilities ==
The station itself houses a large ticket kiosk, public toilets, a McDonald's restaurant, two 7-Eleven's, and a couple of other shops, but the station building is also combined with a three-storey shopping centre (Bruun's Galleri) housing 93 stores, restaurants and cafés and a large underground car park. The upper deck of the groundfloor train station holds a shopping arcade (Bruuns Arkade) with more restaurants, and a two-storey bike parking facility.

The square outside the station (Banegårdsplads) has a taxi hub, a bike-share facility, a pharmacy, a money transfer and exchange store, and more shops, kiosks, cafés and eateries.

The railway terminal has a flow of 13 million people per year.

== Operations ==
Aarhus Central Station serves the whole of Denmark with inter-city rail and Jutland with regional rail. The regional connections include Herning/Skjern in the west and Struer in the northwest.

Aarhus Light Rail with electric trams opened its first line from Aarhus Central Station in December 2017. It connects with Aarhus University Hospital (DNU) in Skejby. In 2018, a southward suburban rail line to Odder opened, and a northbound section to Grenaa is scheduled for 2019. More local expansions of the system are planned for the near future.

== Services ==
The following services currently call at the station:

- Intercity services Frederikshavn–Hjoerring–Aalborg–Aarhus–Fredericia–Odense–Copenhagen–Copenhagen Airport
- Regional services Aarhus–Horsens–Fredericia–Kolding–Esbjerg
- Regional services Herning–Silkeborg–Aarhus
- Local services Struer–Skive–Viborg–Aarhus
- Local services Skjern–Herning–Silkeborg–Aarhus
- Light rail/tramway Odder–Aarhus–Lisbjergskolen/Lystrup
- Light rail/tramway Odder–Aarhus–Skødstrup–Ryomgård–Grenaa

== Gallery ==
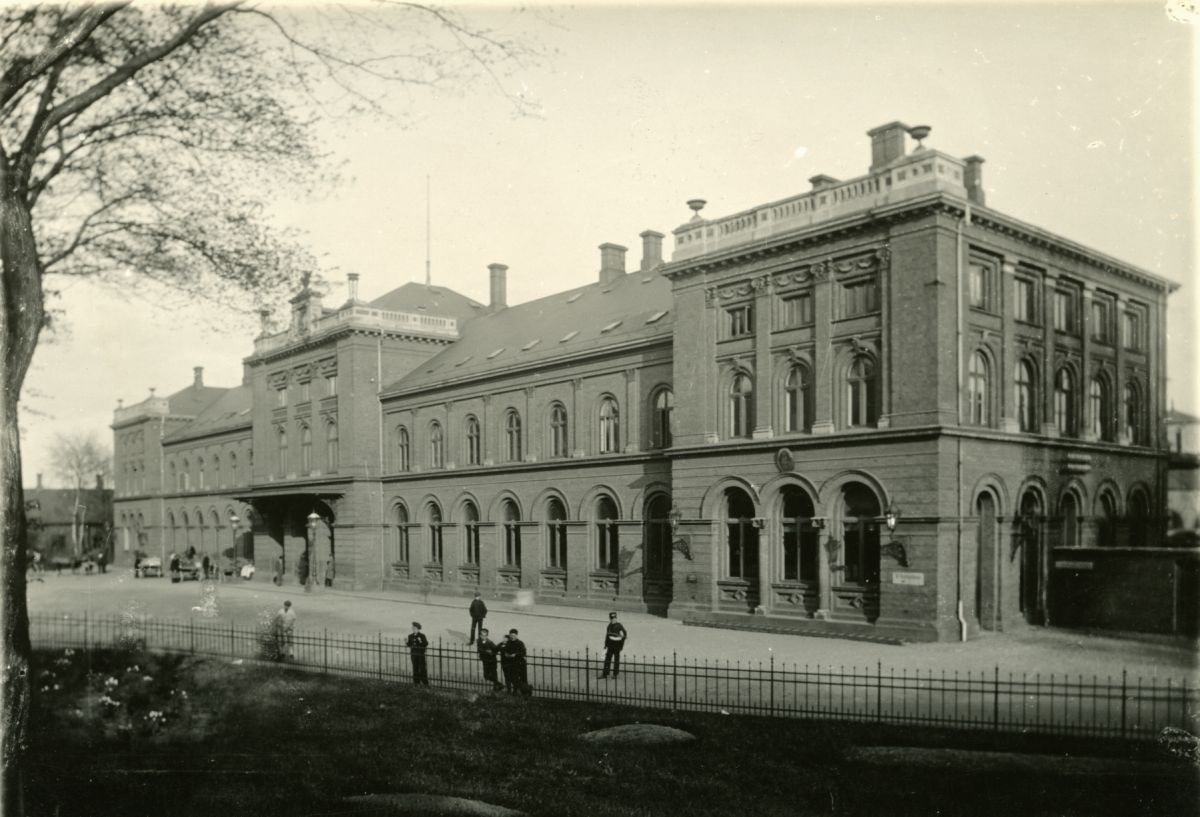
The second station in Aarhus in 1905

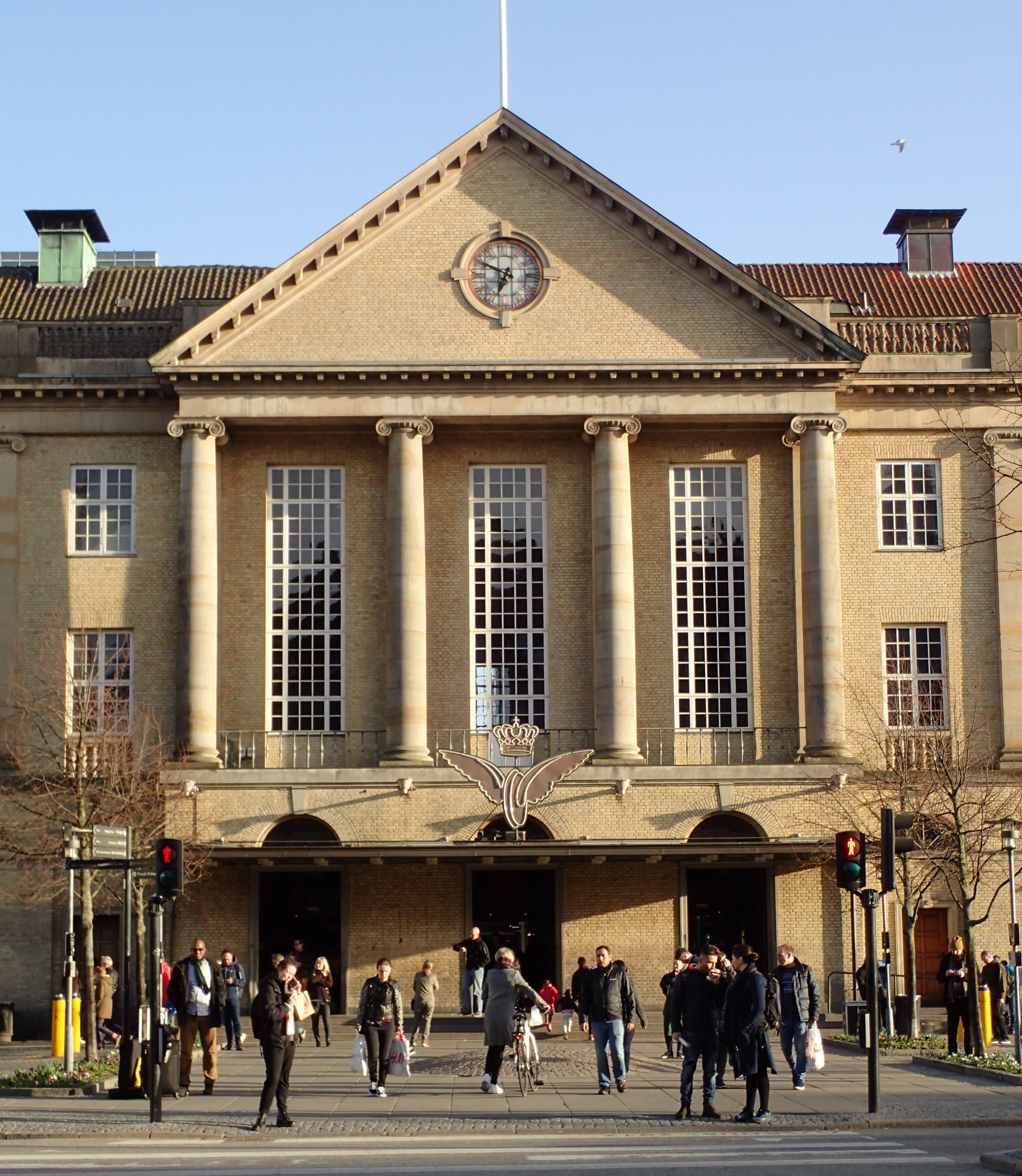
Entry facade of the present station

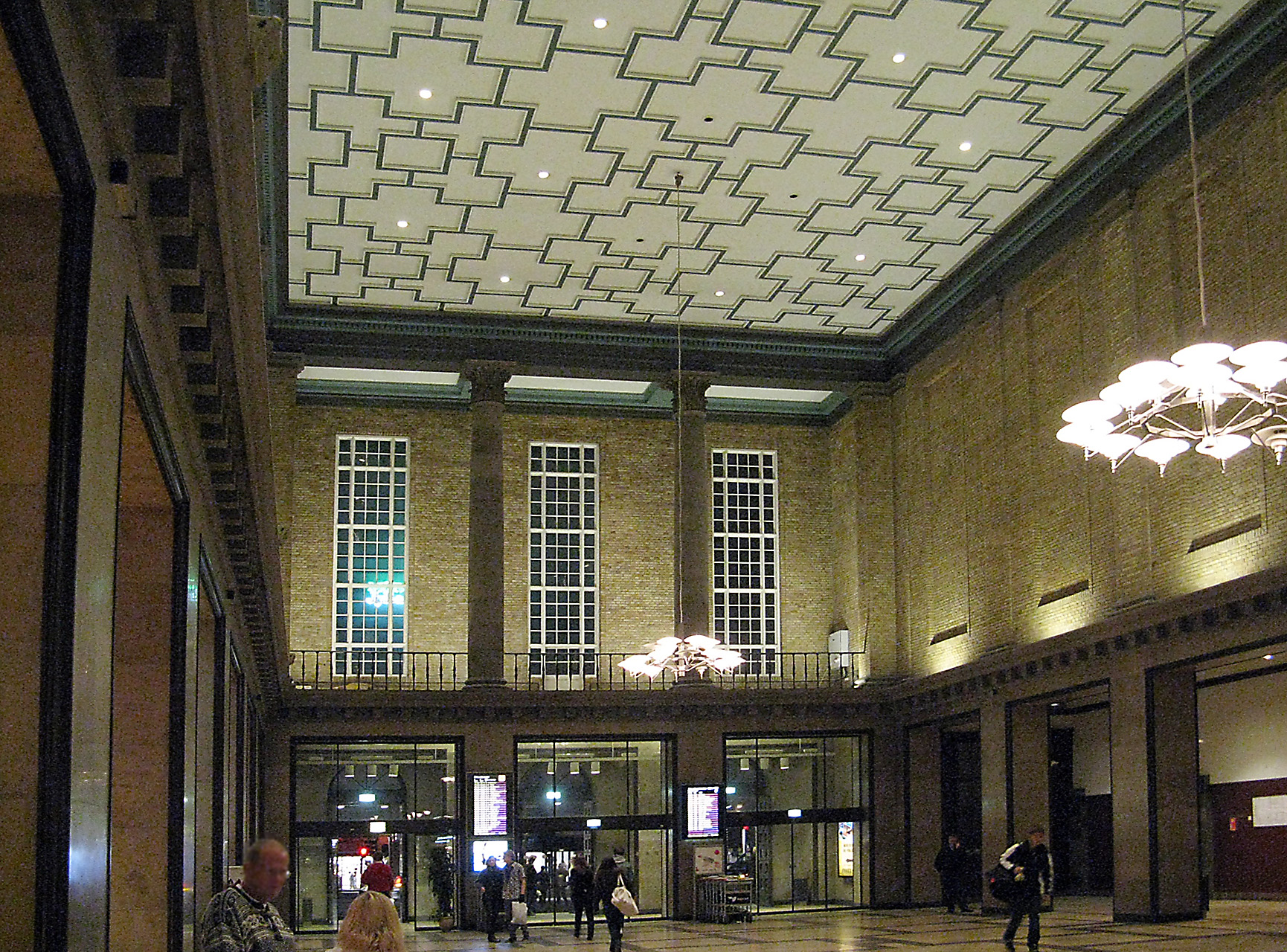
Entrance Hall

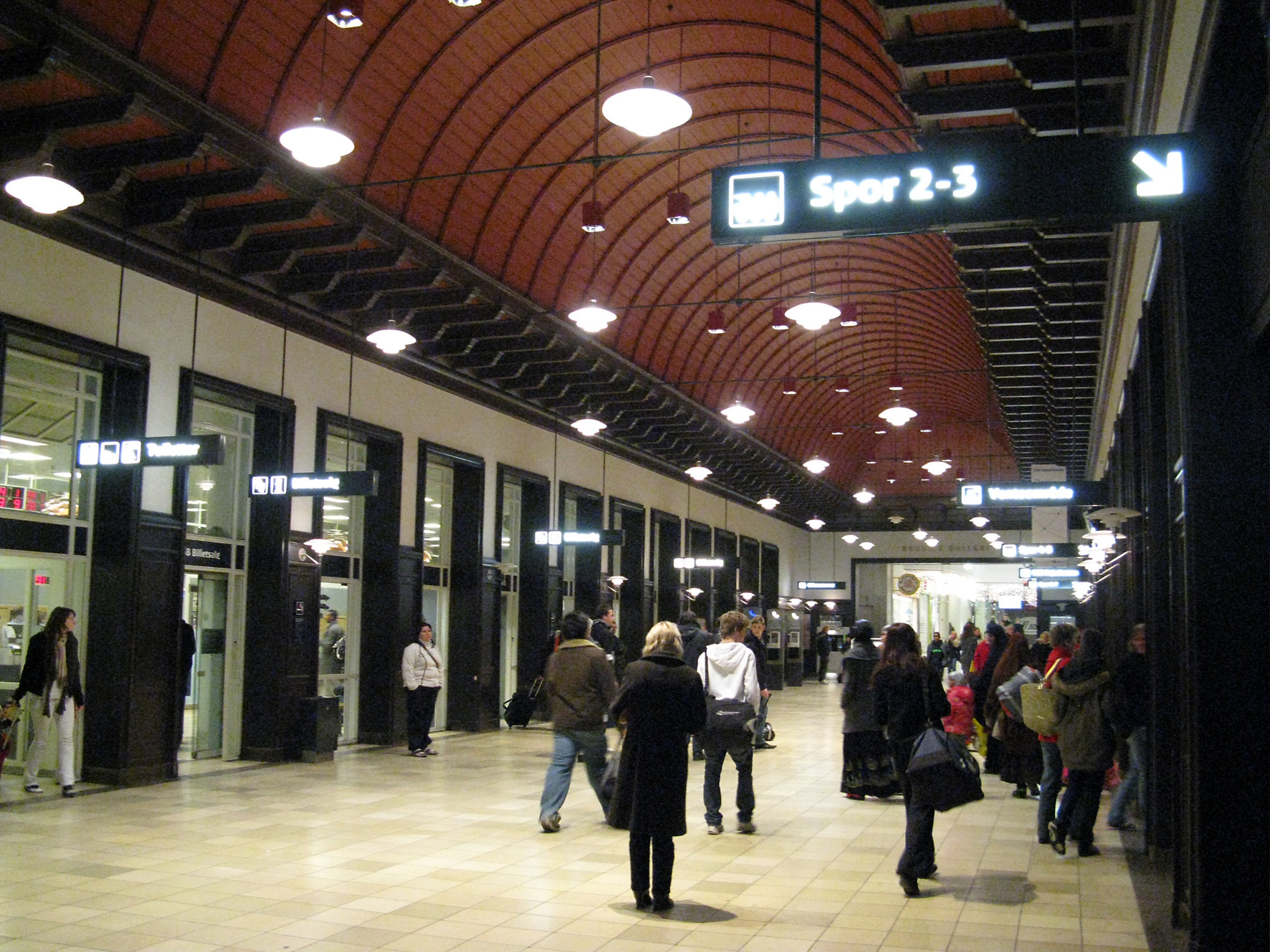
Departure Hall

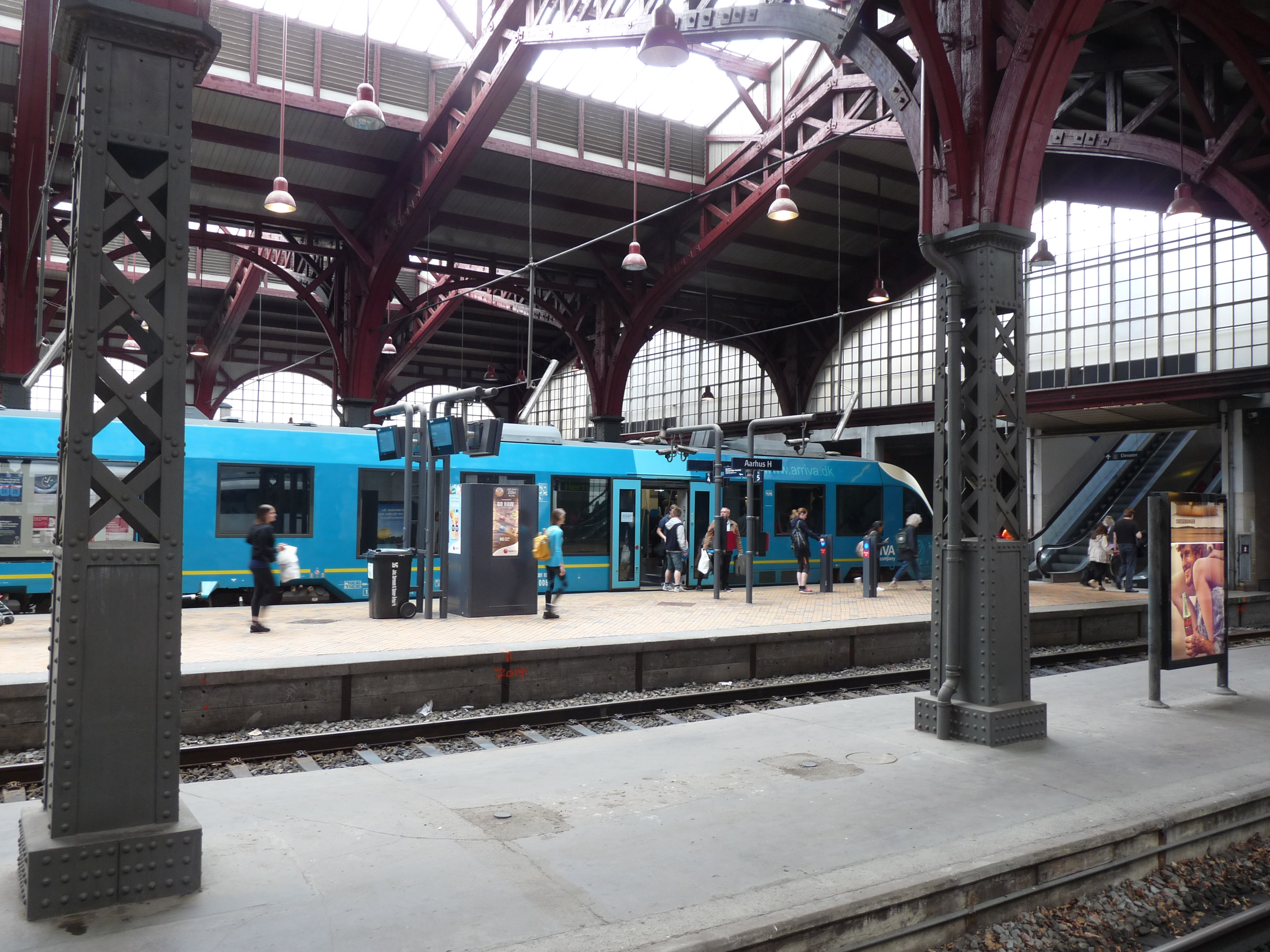
Groundfloor train station

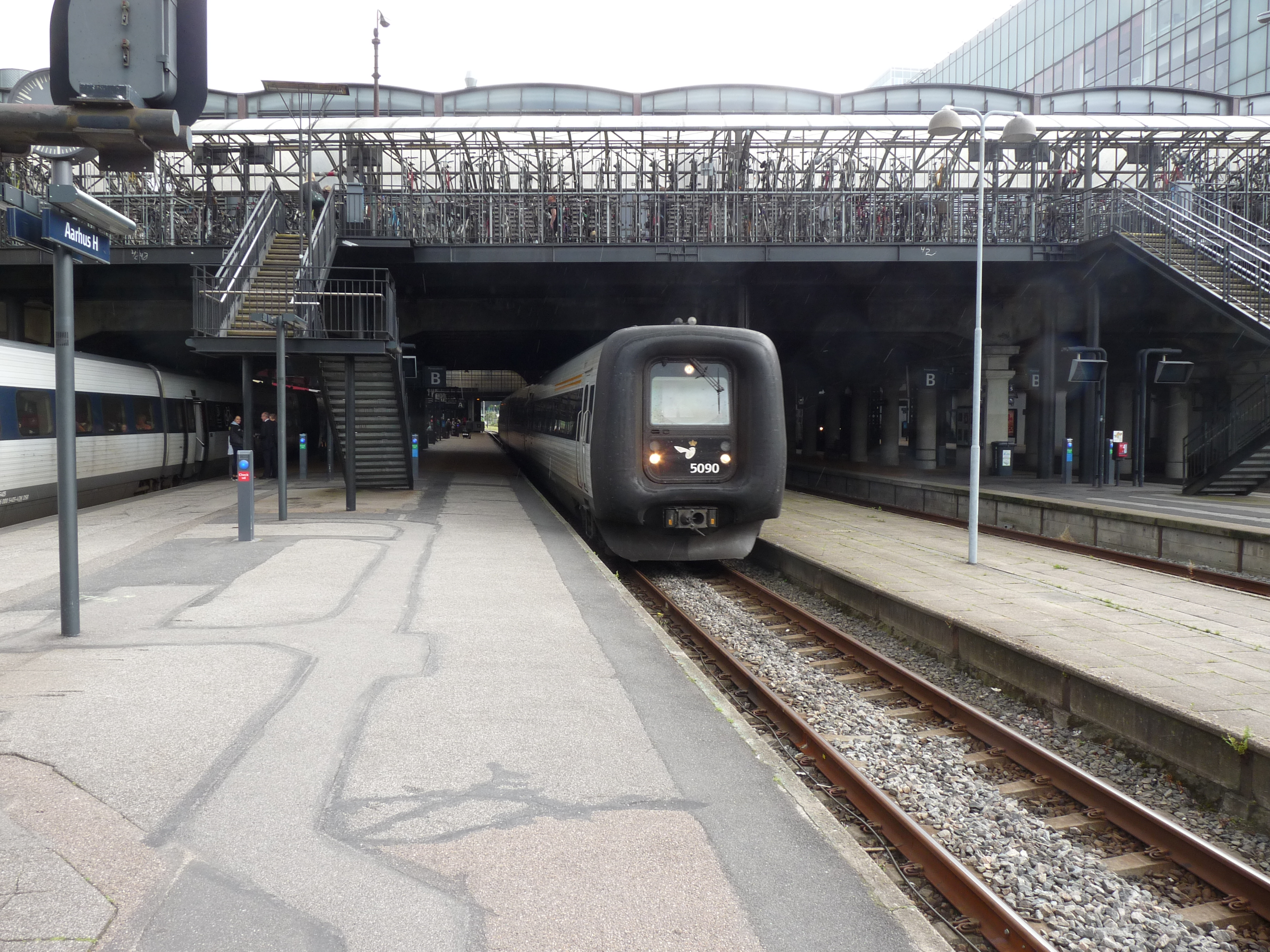
Outside stairways connecting the street level (upper deck) and the railway yard

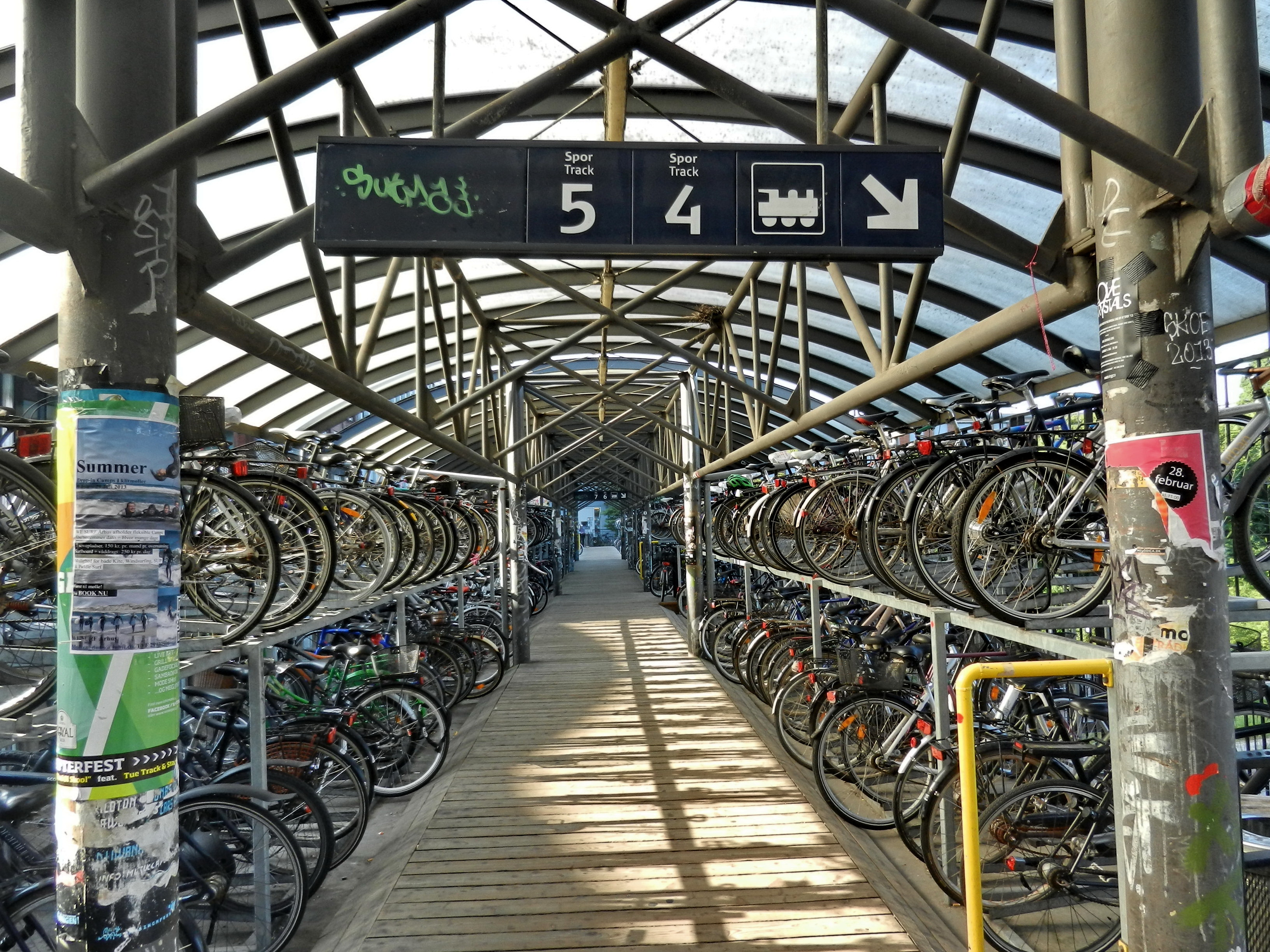
Bike parking corridor (upper deck)

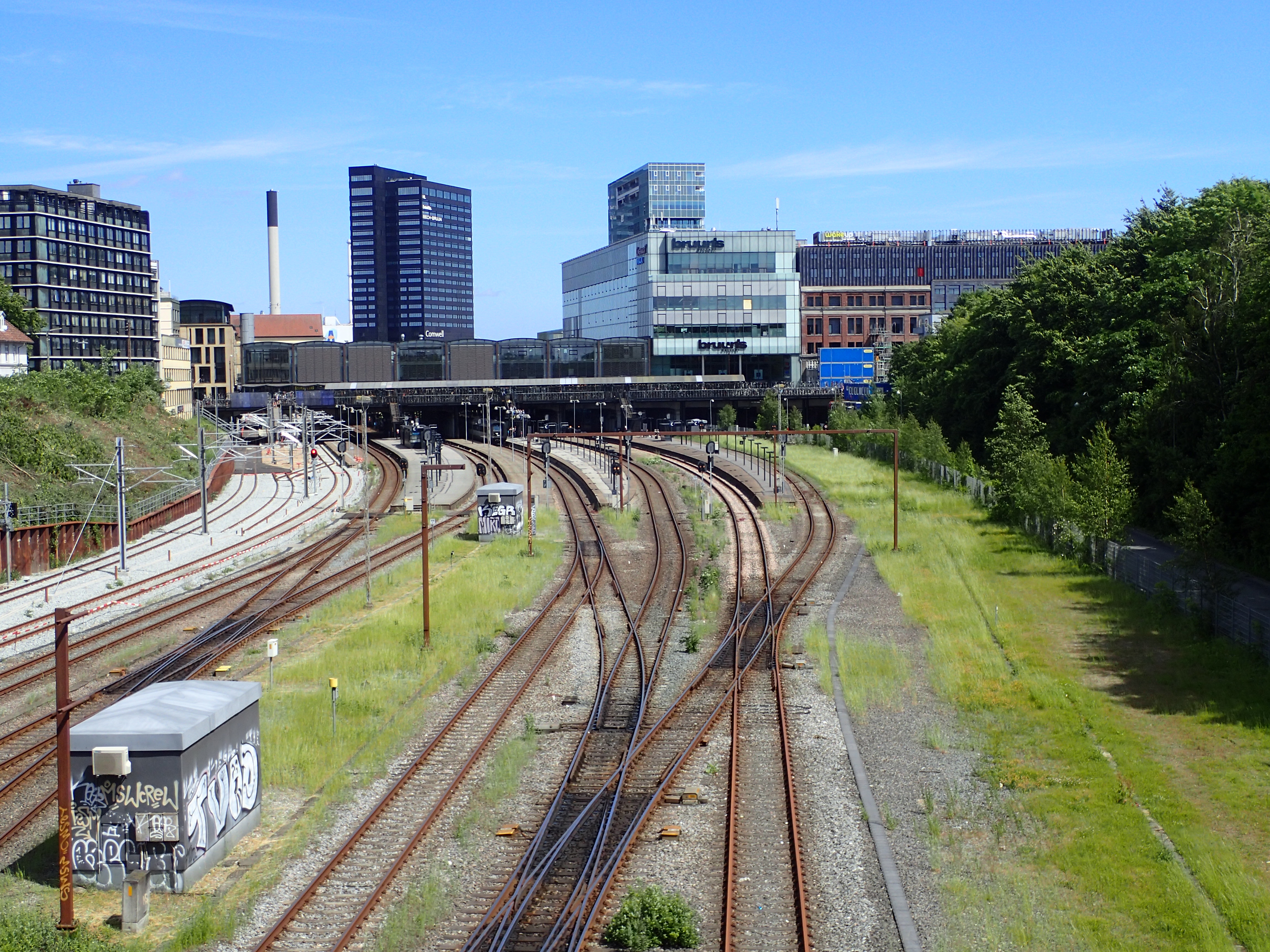
Railway Yard, arrival

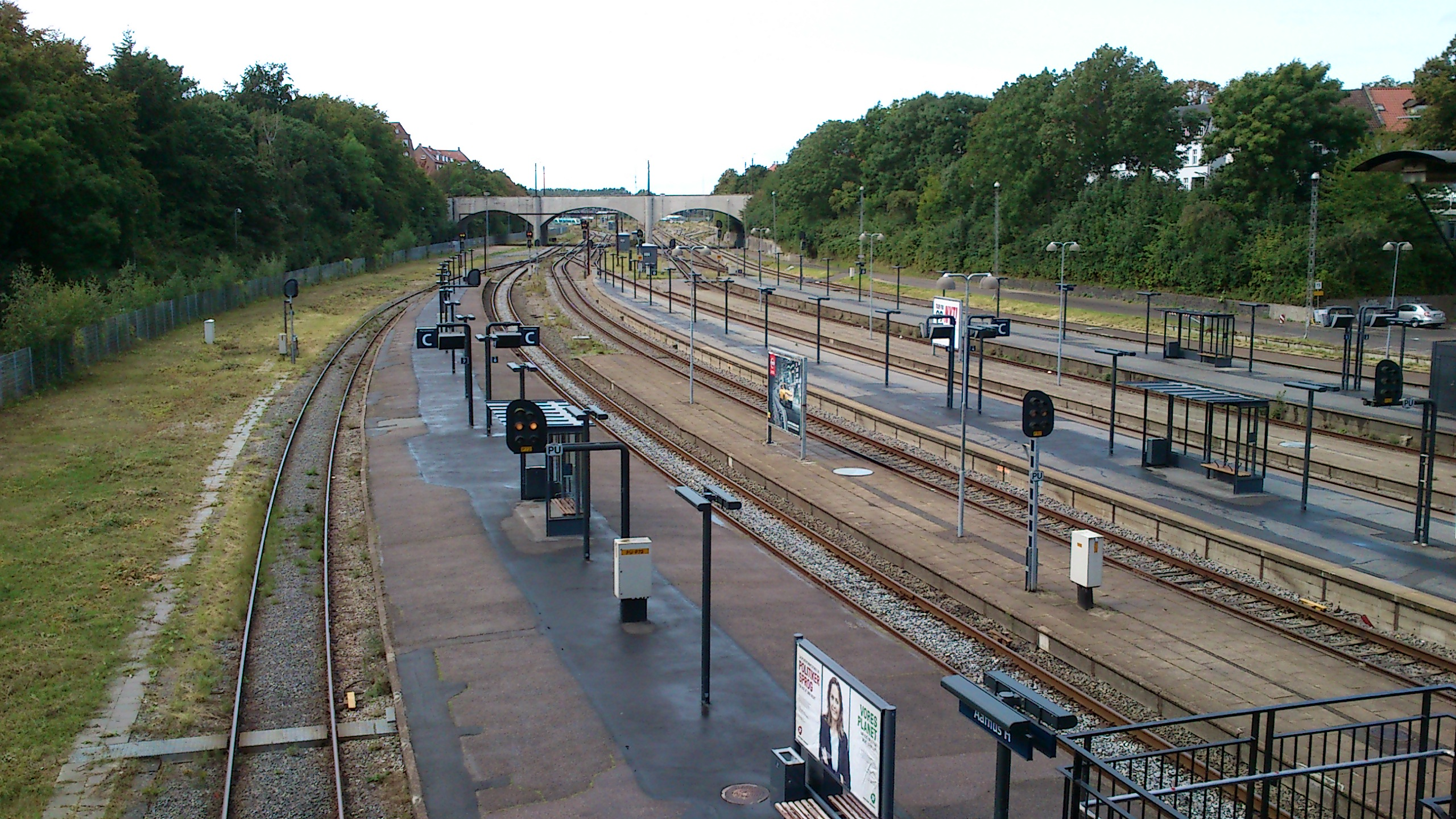
Railway Yard, departure

== See also ==
- List of railway stations in Denmark
- Rail transport in Denmark
- Transport in Denmark
