= Odder =

Town in Jutland, Denmark

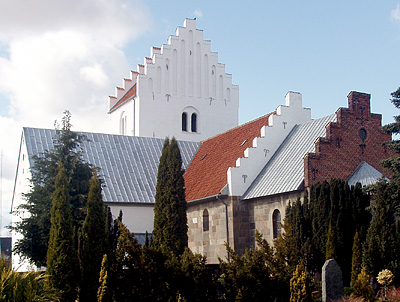
- Odder Church

- Coat of arms

- Location in Denmark Odder (Central Denmark Region)
- Coordinates: 55°58′21″N 10°8′59″E
- Country: Denmark
- Region: Central Denmark
- Municipality: Odder

Area
  - Urban: 7.1 km^{2} (2.7 sq mi)

Population (2026)
  - Urban: 13,644
  - Urban density: 1,900/km^{2} (5,000/sq mi)
  - Gender: 6,491 males and 7,153 females
- Time zone: UTC+1 (CET)
  - Summer (DST): UTC+2 (CEST)
- Postal code: DK-8300 Odder
- Website: Odder.dk

Odder is a town in Jutland, Denmark. The town is the seat of Odder municipality, and is the biggest town in the municipality. It is located 20 km south of Aarhus and 16 km south-east of Skanderborg.

Odder is part of Business Region Aarhus, and the East Jutland metropolitan area, and is served by the Odder Line since 1884 before the line was rebuilt to be part of the Aarhus Letbane in 2016-2018.

== History ==
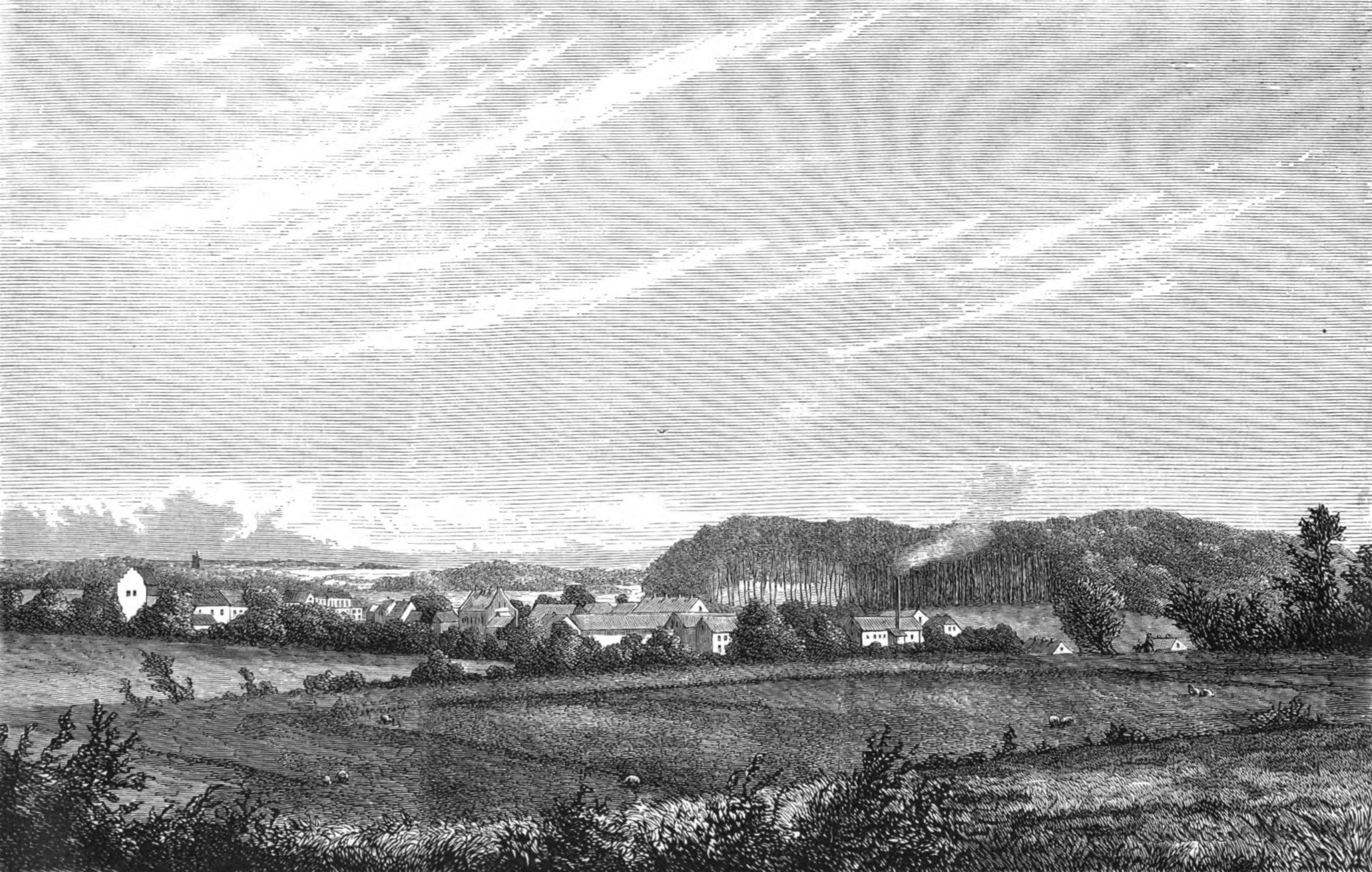
View of Odder in 1870.

Odder is first mentioned in 1363 as Oddræth. The town was built up around Odder River (Danish: Odder Å), which cross through the town. By 1850, the town had grown to the population of about 900 people, and was granted a license to hold a market twice a year. Around the same time, an unsuccessful application was made to dig a canal to the north-east coast.

Odder became a railway town in 1884 when Hads-Ning Herreders Jernbane railway line was established, connecting the city to Hou and Aarhus. In 2018, the railway stretch became a light rail stretch in the Aarhus light rail.

== Arts and culture ==
=== Odder Museum ===
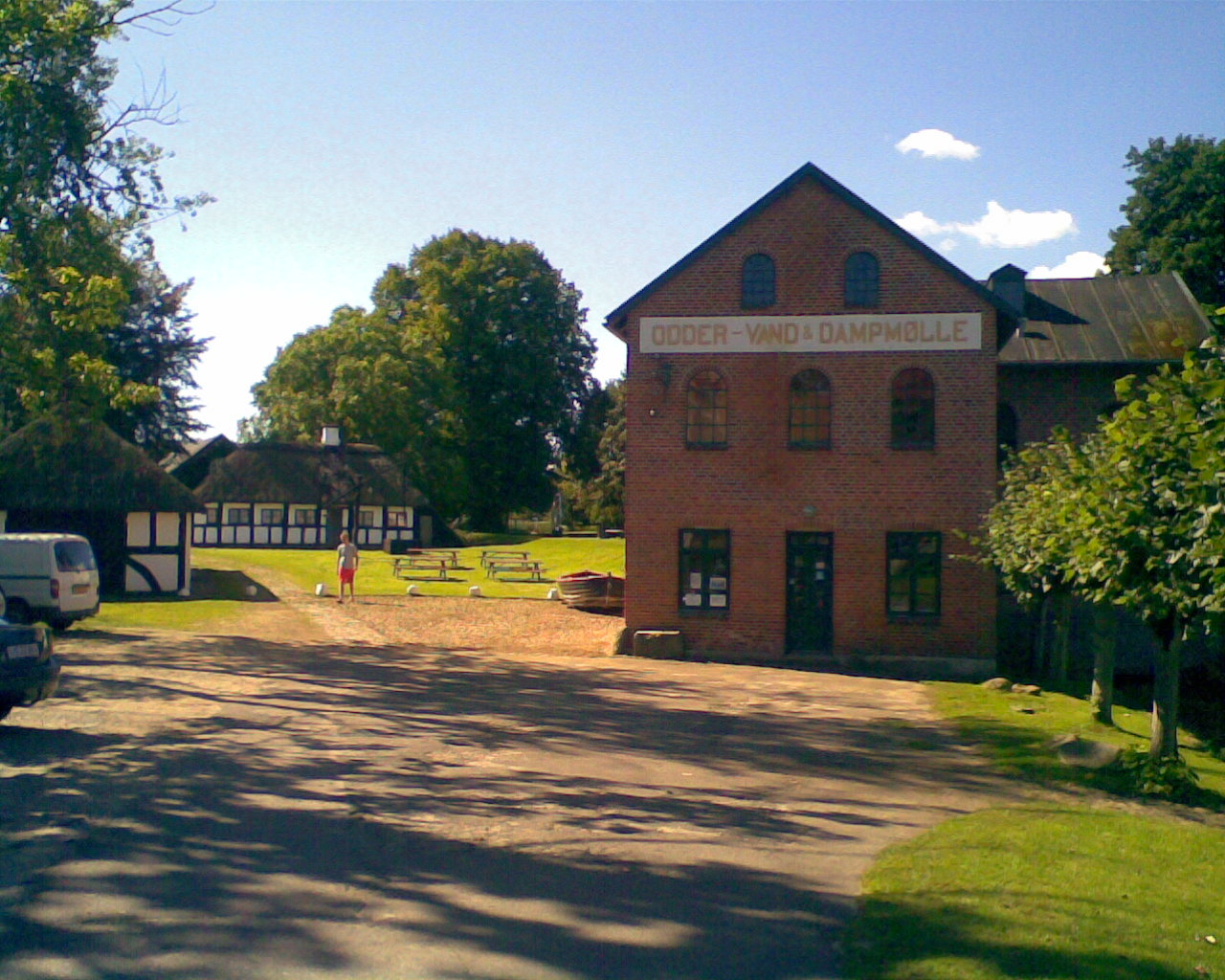
The Odder Water- and Steam Mill.

Odder Museum is located centrally in Odder, next to Odder Water- and Steam Mill (Danish: Odder Vand- og Dampmølle), which is part of the museum. The museum was founded in 1928, and has 400 m^{2} of exhibitions, mainly focussed on local history. The mill is from 1883 and stands as it did when production stopped in 1955.

== Transport ==
=== Rail ===
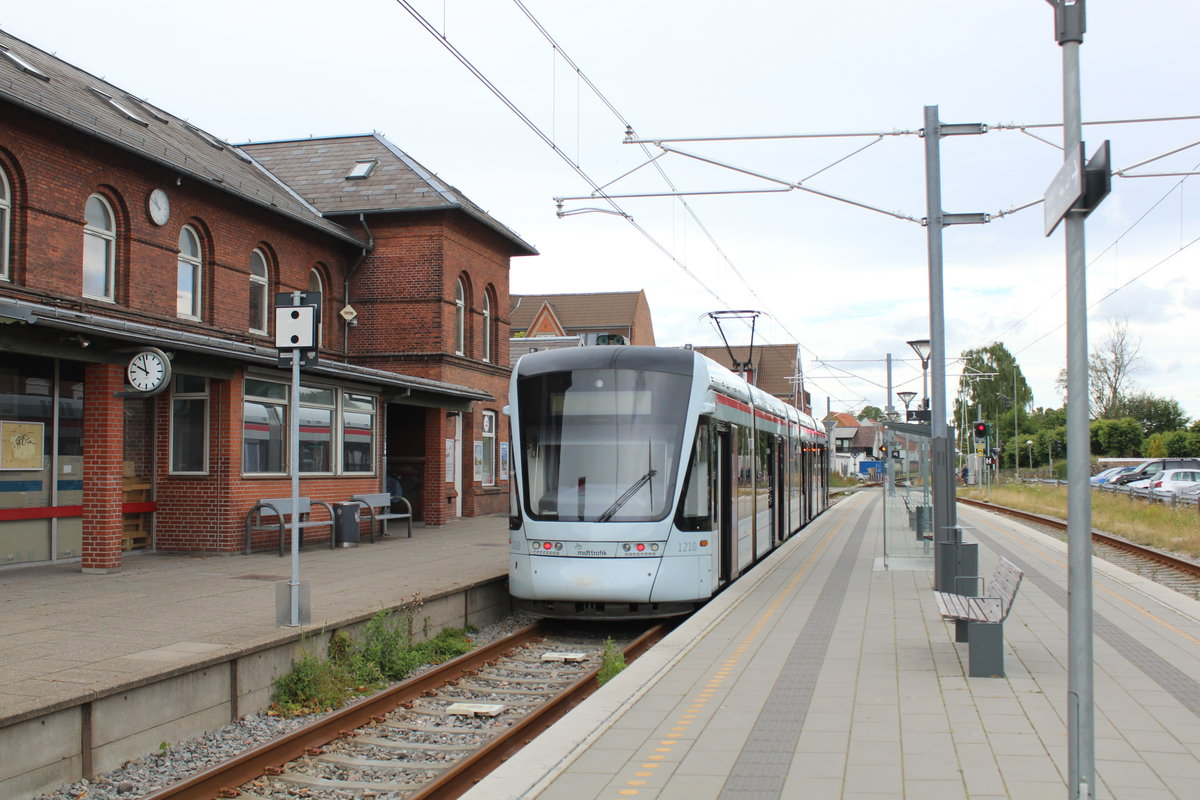
Odder station in 2020.

The Odder railway line connects Odder with Aarhus and the rest of the Danish rail network. Odder railway station is the principal station of the town, and offers direct local train services to Aarhus and Grenaa as part of the Aarhus Light Rail system. The northern part of the town is also served by the railway halt Rude Havvej.

== Sports ==
- Odder RK (1996)
- RK Tacklers (2002)
- Odder Håndbold

== Churches ==
There are 2 lutheran churches in the town of Odder. One is part of the Church of Denmark and the other is an independent church following Grundtvigtianism.

=== Parish Church ===
Odder Parish Church (Danish: Odder Sognekirke) is located near the pedestrian street in the town, bordering Odder River to the north. It was built in the later half of the 1100s. The altarpiece is from 1640 and made by Peder Jensen Kolding. It portrays the Last Supper and in front of the two pillars are figures of the evangelists of Luke and John. Models of Matthew and Mark sit on top of the altarpiece. On top of the altarpiece is also a model of the Crucifixion of Jesus. The church's pulpit is from 1590 to 1600 and the sounding board from 1703. The two church bells are from 1847 and 1854 respectively, and both from Copenhagen. The church once had a turret clock from 1656, but when the clock was unable to be repaired in 1856, the clock was removed and despite the church's desire for a new clock, it was never acquired.

=== Grundtvigtianist Independent Church ===
Odder Grundtvigtianist Independent Church (Danish: Odder Grundtvigske Valgmenighedskirke) is located east of Odder Parish Church, also near the center of the town. It is a church, independent from the Church of Denmark, though largely with the same beliefs. The congregation was founded in 1884 and the church built in 1885 and opened in 1886. The drawings for the church were made by Christen Jensen. The altarpiece displays a young Jesus, and is made by Troels Trier. The organ is from 1899, made by Frederik Nielsen from Aarhus.

== Notable residents ==
- Ejler Bille (1910 — 2004), artist
- Jane Muus (1919 — 2007), painter
- Knud Enggaard (born 1929), politician
- Jens Jørn Spottag (born 1957), actor
- Kirsten Brosbøl (born 1977), politician
- Mette Dencker (born 1978), politician and MF
- Morten Nørgaard (born 1990), singer

=== Sport ===
- Hans Christian Nielsen (1928 — 1990), football player
- Niels Fredborg (born 1946), cyclist
- Henrik Mortensen (born 1968), football player
- Jakob Fenger-Larsen (born 1971), football player
- Torben Grimmel (born 1975), sport shooter
- Pernille Harder (born 1977), badminton player
- Juliane Rasmussen (born 1979), rower
- Louise Pedersen (born 1979), handball player
- Steffen Ernemann (born 1982), football player
- Thomas Mogensen (born 1983), handball player
- Thomas Kvist (born 1987), cyclist
- Anders Skaarup Rasmussen (born 1989), badminton player
- Steffen Jensen (born 1989), rower
- Morten Ring Christensen (born 1990), athlete
- Mathias Bay-Smidt (born 1996), badminton player

== Sources ==
- Eric Pettersson (2014). Odder - en by i provinsen (in Danish). Lindhardt og Ringhof.
