= Fredericia–Aarhus railway line =

Railway line in Denmark

Coordinates: 55.9396°N 9.9639°E

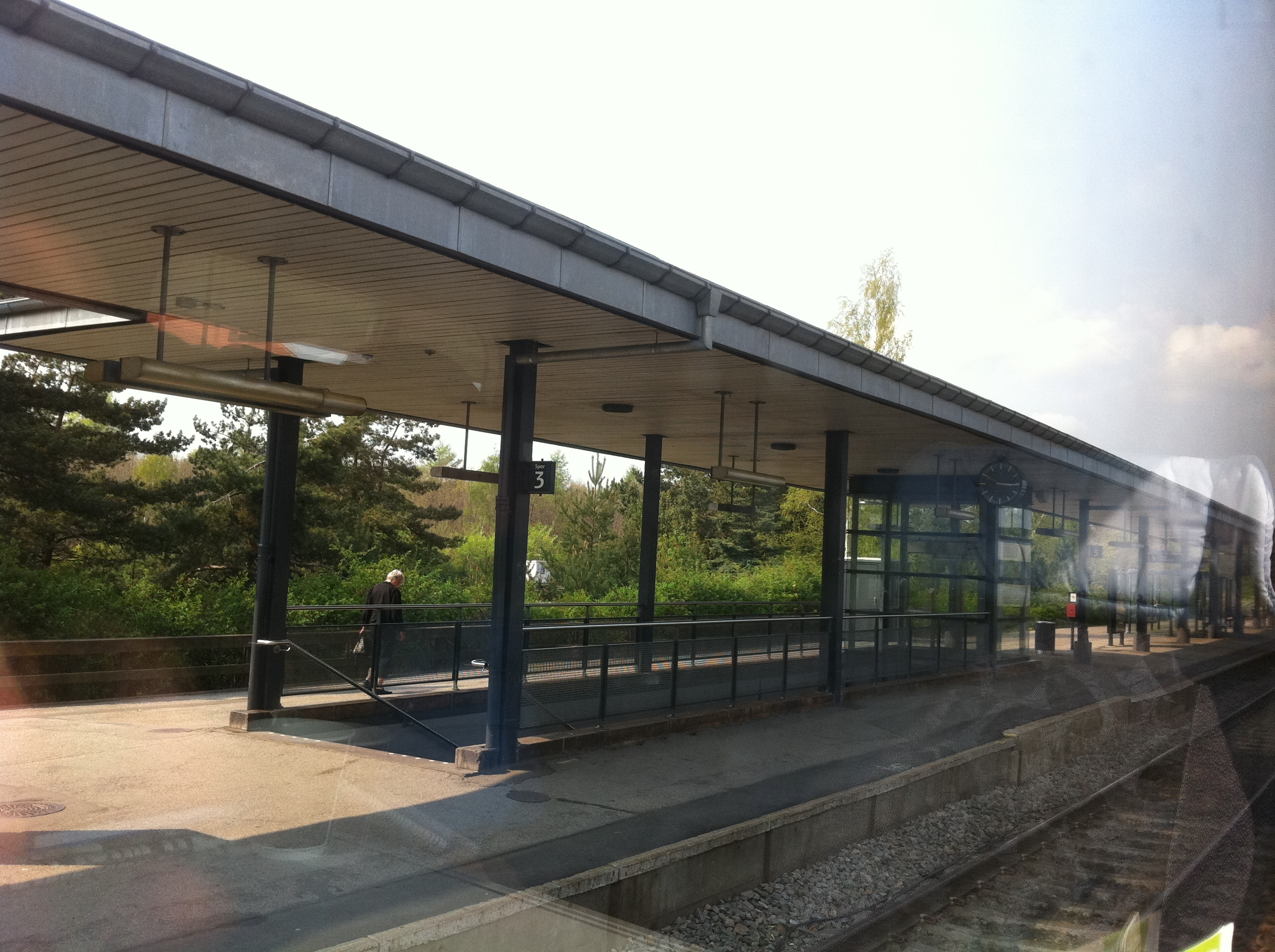
- Horsens railway station in 2011

Overview
- Native name: Fredericia–Aarhus Jernbane
- Status: Active
- Owner: Banedanmark
- Termini: Fredericia; Aarhus Central
- Stations: 11

Service
- Type: Main line
- System: Danish railways
- Operator(s): DSB; Arriva (Skanderborg–Aarhus); Railion; CFL Cargo

History
- Opened: 4 October 1868

Technical
- Line length: 108.5 km (67.4 mi)
- Number of tracks: Double
- Character: passenger and freight
- Track gauge: 1,435 mm (4 ft 8 1/2 in)
- Electrification: None
- Operating speed: 160 km/h (99 mph); 180 km/h (110 mph) (certified multiple units only)
Route map
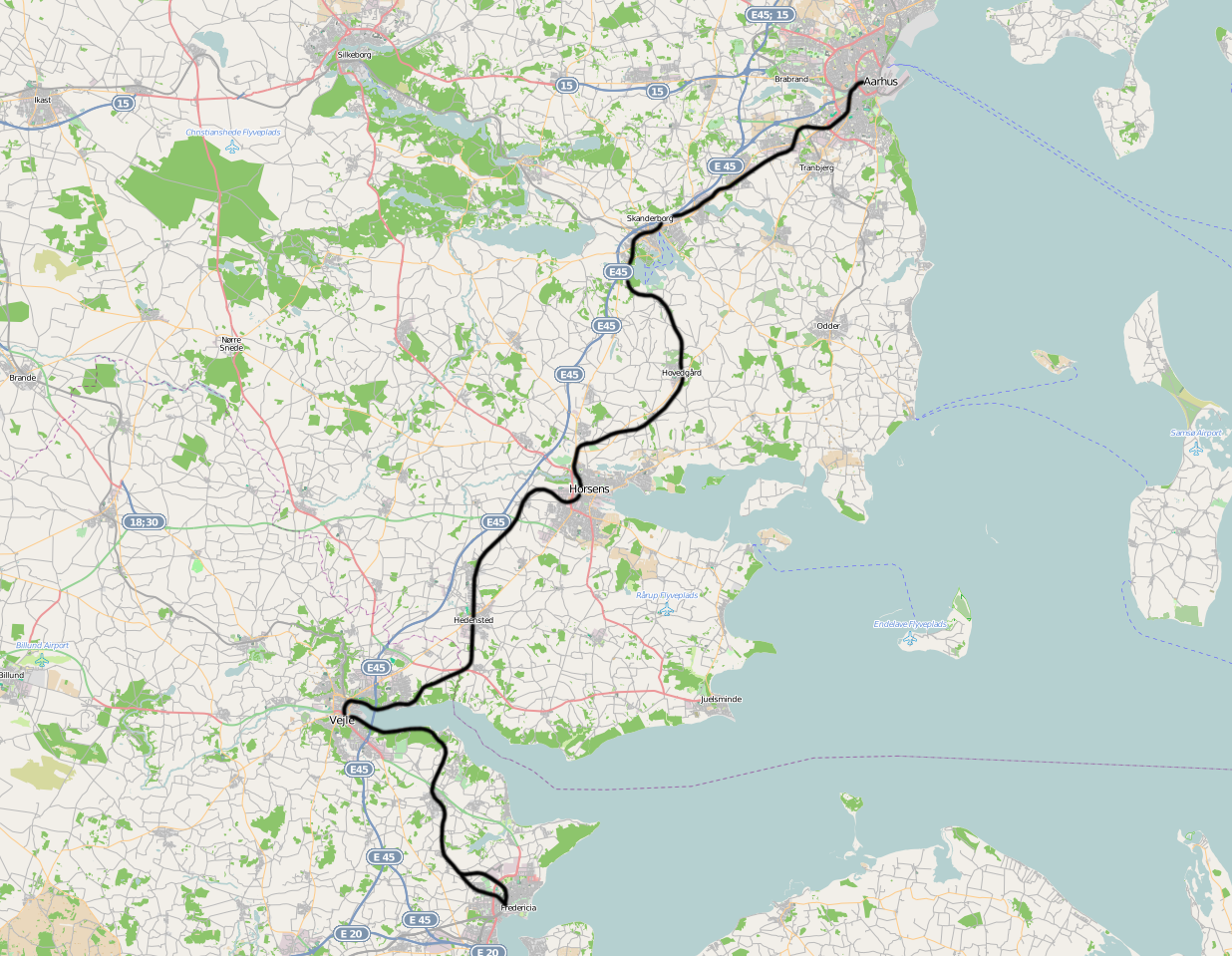

The Fredericia–Aarhus railway line (Danish: Fredericia–Aarhus Jernbane) is a 108.5 km (67.4 mi) long standard-gauge double-track railway line in Denmark which runs between the cities of Fredericia and Aarhus in East Jutland. It constitutes a section of the East Jutland longitudinal railway line (Danish: Den Østjyske Længdebane), the through route along the east coast of the Jutland Peninsula from the German border at Padborg to the port city of Frederikshavn in North Jutland.

The railway opened in 1868. The line is owned and maintained by Rail Net Denmark and served with passenger trains by the railway companies DSB and Arriva.

== Future ==
As part of plans for high-speed rail in Denmark, a new section of track between Hovedgård and Hasselager, bypassing Skanderborg, is planned.
