= List of railway stations in Denmark =

This article shows a list of railway stations and railway halts in Denmark.

== List ==
Station	Code	Opened	Serves	Railway line	Passengers	Remarks
Albertslund	Alb	1931	Albertslund	Høje Taastrup Line		Named Vridsløselille until 1963
Alken	Ak	1871	Alken	Skanderborg–Skjern	150	
Allerød	Li	1864	Lillerød	North Line	7900	Named Lillerød until 1952
Amstrup	Amt	1903		Lemvig Line		
Arden	Ad	1869	Arden	Randers–Aalborg	450	Previously named Store-Arden
Armose	Arm	1902		Lemvig Line		
Asnæs	Asn	1899	Asnæs	Odsherred Line		
Assedrup	Ass	1884	Assedrup	Odder Line		
Aulum	Uu	1904	Aulum	Vejle–Holstebro	440	
Avedøre	Avø	1972	Avedøre	Køge Bay Line	5100	
Avnede	Avn	1874	Lille Avnede	Lolland Line		
Bagmarken	Bmt	1988		Tølløse Line		
Bagsværd	Bav	1906	Bagsværd	Hareskov Line	5300	
Balleby	Bat	1899	Balleby	Lemvig Line		
Ballerup	Ba	1879	Ballerup	Frederikssund Line	14100	
Baunhøj	Bah	1942	Oksbøl	Varde–Nørre Nebel		
Beder	Bed	1884	Beder	Odder Line		
Bedsted Thy	Bn	1882	Bedsted	Thy Line	150	
Bernstorffsvej	Bft	1936	Hellerup	North Line	2700	
Billum	Bim	1902	Billum	Varde–Nørre Nebel		
Birk Centerpark	Bic	1997	Herning	Skanderborg–Skjern	340	
Birkerød	Bi	1864	Birkerød	North Line	7900	
Bispebjerg	Bit	1996	Bispebjerg	Ring Line	5200	
Bjerringbro	Bj	1863	Bjerringbro	Langå–Struer	1100	
Bording	Bg	1877	Bording	Skanderborg–Skjern	170	
Borris	Bs	1881	Borris	Skanderborg–Skjern	100	
Borup	Bo	1856	Borup	West Line	2200	
Boulevarden	Bot	1987	Varde	Varde–Nørre Nebel		
Bramming	Bm	1874	Bramming	Lunderskov–Esbjerg	2000	
Brande	Bb	1914	Brande	Vejle–Holstebro	730	
Bred	Bd	1865	Bred	Funen Main Line	110	
Brede	Bre	1900	Brede	Nærum Line		
Bredebro	Bw	1887	Bredebro	Bramming–Tønder	190	
Brejning	Bet	1868	Brejning	Fredericia–Aarhus	180	
Brødeskov	Bsk	1950	Nørre Herlev	Frederiksværk Line		
Brøndby Strand	Bsa	1972	Brøndby Strand	Køge Bay Line	4700	
Brøndbyøster	Bøt	1953	Brøndbyøster		5600	
Brønderslev	Bl	1871	Brønderslev	Vendsyssel Line	2100	
Brøns	Brr	1887	Brøns	Bramming–Tønder	70	
Brørup	Bp	1874	Brørup	Lunderskov–Esbjerg	540	
Buddinge	Bud	1906	Buddinge	Hareskov Line	5800	
Bunken	Buk	1890		Skagen Line		
Bur	Bu	1875	Bur	Esbjerg–Struer	30	
Bækmarksbro	Bkm	1879	Bækmarksbro	Lemvig Line		
Børkop	Bk	1868	Børkop	Fredericia–Aarhus	410	
Carlsberg	Cb	2016	Vesterbro/Kongens Enghave			Replaced Enghave in 2016
Charlottenlund	Ch	1863	Charlottenlund	Klampenborg Line	4200	
Danshøj	Dah	2005	Valby	Ring Line		
Dianalund	Dia	1901	Dianalund	Tølløse Line		
Dokk1	Dok	2017	Aarhus	Grenaa Line		
Dronningmølle	Drm	1916	Dronningmølle	Hornbæk Line		
Duemose	Dug	1897		Gribskov Line		
Dybbølsbro	Dbt	1934	Vesterbro/Kongens Enghave		12100	
Dyreby	Dy	1945	Dyreby	Varde–Nørre Nebel		
Dyssegård	Dyt	1932	Vangede	Hareskov Line	1300	
Dyssekilde	Dsk	1916	Torup	Frederiksværk Line		
Døstrup Sønderjylland	Ds	1887	Døstrup	Bramming–Tønder		named Döstrup until 1920
Egedal	Gtg	2002	Ølstykke-Stenløse	Frederikssund Line		named Gammel Toftegård until 2011
Egøje	Egø	1928	Egøje	East Line		
Ejby	Eb	1865	Ejby	Funen Main Line	440	
Emdrup	Emt	1906	Emdrup	Hareskov Line	4800	closed 1948–1977
Emmersbæk	Emm	1925	Hirtshals	Hirtshals Line		previously named Terpet
Engesvang	Ev	1877	Engesvang	Skanderborg–Skjern	350	
Esbjerg	Es	1904	Esbjerg	Lunderskov–Esbjerg; Esbjerg–Struer	4800	
Eskilstrup	Ek	1872	Eskilstrup	South Line	350	
Espergærde	Gæ	1898	Espergærde	Coast Line	5000	
Farum	Fm	1906	Farum	Hareskov Line		
Favrholm	Fvt	2023	Hillerød	North Line; Frederiksværk Line		
Faxe Ladeplads	Fxl	1864	Faxe Ladeplads	East Line		
Faxe Syd	Fxs	1864	Faxe	East Line		previously named Stubberup, Fakse B and Fakse
Firhøj	Fir	1916	Firhøj and Munkerup	Hornbæk Line		
Fjellenstrup	Fjg	1982	Gilleleje	Gribskov Line		
Flintholm	Fl	2004	Frederiksberg	Frederikssund Line; Ring Line	11200	
Fredensborg	Fd	1864	Fredensborg	Little North Line		
Fredericia	Fa	1866	Fredericia	Fredericia–Aarhus; Fredericia–Padborg	5900	
Frederiksberg	Fb	1864	Frederiksberg			
Frederikshavn	Fh	1871	Frederikshavn	Vendsyssel Line; Skagen Line	1500	
Frederikshavnsvej	Fhv	1992	Skagen	Skagen Line		
Frederikssund	Fs	1879	Frederikssund	Frederikssund Line	5400	
Frederiksværk	Frv	1897	Frederiksværk	Frederiksværk Line		
Friheden	Frh	1972	Hvidovre	Køge Bay Line	7100	
Frisvadvej	Frt	1962	Varde	Varde–Nørre Nebel		
Fruens Bøge	Frs	1876	Odense	Svendborg Line	160	
Fuglebakken	Fut	1936	Frederiksberg	Ring Line	4300	
Fuglevad	Fgv	1900	Fuglevad	Nærum Line		
Fåre	Fre	1879	Fåre	Lemvig Line		
Fårevejle	Fvj	1899	Fårevejle Stationsby	Odsherred Line		
Gadstrup	Gt	1905	Gadstrup	Little South Line		
Gelsted	Gd	1905	Gelsted	Funen Main Line	370	
Gentofte	Gj	1863	Gentofte	North Line	3300	
Gilleleje	Gll	1896	Gilleleje	Gribskov Line; Hornbæk Line		
Gilleleje East	Glø	1916	Gilleleje	Hornbæk Line		
Gislinge	Gsl	1899	Gislinge	Odsherred Line		
Give	Gw	1894	Give	Vejle–Holstebro	530	
Gjesing	Gje		Gjesing	Esbjerg–Struer	280	
Glostrup	Gl	1847	Glostrup	Høje Taastrup Line	15900	
Glumsø	Gz	1924	Glumsø	South Line	950	
Godhavn	Ghg	1924	Tisvilde	Gribskov Line		
Gredstedbro	Gs	1875	Gredstedbro	Bramming–Tønder	220	
Grenaa	Gr	1866	Grenaa	Grenaa Line		
Greve	Gre	1979	Greve Strand	Køge Bay Line	6400	
Grevinge	Grv	1899	Grevinge	Odsherred Line		
Gribsø	Gøg	1880	Gribskov	Gribskov Line		
Grimstrup	Gsf	1897	Grimstrup	Frederiksværk Line		
Grubberholm	Grh	1881		East Line		
Grænge	Grg	1874		Lolland Line		
Græsted	Græ	1880	Græsted	Gribskov Line		
Græsted Syd	Grs	1991	Græsted	Gribskov Line		
Grøndal	Ght	1930	Vanløse	Ring Line	4000	
Grønholt	Grt	1934	Grønholt	Little North Line		
Grønnehave	Grø	1906	Helsingør	Hornbæk Line		
Gråsten	Gst	1899	Gråsten	Sønderborg Line	140	
Guldager	Gu	1874	Guldager Stationsby	Esbjerg–Struer	90	
Gunnar Clausensvej	Gc	1975	Viby J	Odder Line		
Gødstrup	Gp	1904	Gødstrup	Vejle–Holstebro		closed 1969–2021
Gørding	Gø	1874	Gørding	Lunderskov–Esbjerg	260	
Gørløse	Gør	1950	Gørløse	Frederiksværk Line		
Gårde	Gå	1878	Gårde	Esbjerg–Struer	50	
Hadsten	Ha	1862	Hadsten	Aarhus–Randers		
Hammerum	Hu	1877	Hammerum	Skanderborg–Skjern	160	
Hanehoved	Hhf	1922	Frederiksværk	Frederiksværk Line		
Harboøre	Hbø	1899	Harboøre	Lemvig Line		
Hareskov	Har	1906	Hareskovby	Hareskov Line	1600	
Haslev	Hz	1870	Haslev	Little South Line	2000	
Havdrup	Hd	1870	Havdrup	Little South Line	1000	
Hedehusene	Hh	1847	Hedehusene	West Line	1800	
Hedensted	Hed	1868	Hedensted	Fredericia–Aarhus	470	closed 1974–2006
Hee	He	1875	Hee	Esbjerg–Struer	50	
Hellebæk	Hel	1906	Hellebæk	Hornbæk Line		
Hellerup	Hl	1863	Hellerup	Coast Line; Klampenborg Line; North Line; Ring Line	20300	
Helsinge	Hlg	1897	Helsinge	Gribskov Line		
Helsingør	Hg	1864	Helsingør	Coast Line; Hornbæk Line; Little North Line	11300	
Henne	Hnn	1903	Henne Stationsby	Varde–Nørre Nebel		
Herfølge	Hf	1908	Herfølge	Little South Line	550	
Herlev	Her	1879	Herlev	Frederikssund Line	10300	
Herning	Hr	1877	Herning	Vejle–Holstebro; Skanderborg–Skjern	4100	
Herning Messecenter	Hrm	1997	Messecenter Herning	Skanderborg–Skjern	50	
Herregårdsparken	Her	2004	Hjørring	Hirtshals Line		
Hessel	Hsl	2019	Grenaa	Grenaa Line		
Hillerød	Hi	1864	Hillerød	Frederiksværk Line; Gribskov Line; Little North Line; North Line	13100	
Himlingøje	Hmø	1926		East Line		
Hinnerup	Hn	1862	Hinnerup	Aarhus–Randers	840	closed 1979–1994
Hirtshals	Hhs	1925	Hirtshals	Hirtshals Line		
Hjallese	Hjs	1876	Hjallese	Svendborg Line	100	
Hjerm	Hm	1868	Hjerm	Esbjerg–Struer	140	
Hjortshøj	Ht	1877	Hjortshøj	Grenaa Line		closed 1969–1979
Hjørring	Hj	1871	Hjørring	Vendsyssel Line; Hirtshals Line	3200	
Hjørring Øst	Hjø	2021	Hjørring	Vendsyssel Line		
Hobro	Hb	1869	Hobro	Randers–Aalborg railway line	1300	
Holbæk	Hk	1874	Holbæk	Northwest Line; Odsherred Line	6700	
Holløse	Hog	1924	Holløse	Gribskov Line		
Holme-Olstrup	Ol	1870	Holme-Olstrup	Little South Line	190	
Holmstrup	Hp	1865	Holmstrup	Funen Main Line	40	
Holstebro	Ho	1866	Holstebro	Esbjerg–Struer; Vejle–Holstebro	2500	
Holsted	Hq	1874	Holsted	Lunderskov–Esbjerg	400	
Holte	Hot	1864	Holte	North Line	7900	
Hornbæk	Hnk	1906	Hornbæk	Hornbæk Line		
Horne	Hor	1925	Horne	Hirtshals Line		
Horneby Sand	Hsa	1938	Hornbæk	Hornbæk Line		
Hornslet	Os	1877	Hornslet	Grenaa Line		
Horsens	Hs	1868	Horsens	Fredericia–Aarhus	4500	
Høvelte	Høv	1951	Høvelte Barracks	North Line		
Hulsig	Hul	1890	Hulsig	Skagen Line		
Humlebæk	Hum	1897	Humlebæk	Coast Line	5300	
Humlum	Um	1882	Humlum	Thy Line	70	
Hundested	Hun	1916	Hundested	Frederiksværk Line		
Hundested Havn	Huh	1928	Hundested	Frederiksværk Line		
Hundige	Und	1976	Hundige	Køge Bay Line	7800	
Hurup Thy	Ur	1882	Hurup Thy	Thy Line	370	
Husum	Hut	1880	Husum	Frederikssund Line	4500	
Hvalsø	Hv	1874	Kirke Hvalsø	Northwest Line	3100	
Hvidbjerg	Hw	1882	Hvidbjerg	Thy Line	180	
Hviding	Vd	1887	Egebæk-Hviding	Bramming–Tønder	130	
Hvidovre	Hit	1935	Hvidovre	Høje Taastrup Line	5000	
Hyllerslev	Hyv	1903	Hyllerslev	Varde–Nørre Nebel		
Højby Fyn	Høs	1876	Højby	Svendborg Line	130	
Højby Sjælland	Hbs	1899	Højby	Odsherred Line		
Høje Taastrup	Htå	1986	Høje-Taastrup	Høje Taastrup Line; West Line	20700	
Højslev	Hø	1865	Højslev Stationsby	Langå–Struer		
Højstrup	Høp	1906	Helsingør	Hornbæk Line		
Høng	Øn	1898	Høng	Tølløse Line		
Hørdum	Hæ	1882	Hørdum	Thy Line	70	
Hørning	Hx	1868	Hørning	Fredericia–Aarhus	530	
Hørve	Hve	1899	Hørve	Odsherred Line		
Hårlev	Hrl	1879	Hårlev	East Line		
Ikast	Ik	1877	Ikast	Skanderborg–Skjern		
Ishøj	Ih	1976	Ishøj	Køge Bay Line	10500	
Islev	Ist	1949	Islev	Frederikssund Line	2100	
Janderup	Ja	1903	Janderup	Varde–Nørre Nebel		
Jegum	Je	1992	Jegum	Varde–Nørre Nebel		
Jelling	Jl	1894	Jelling	Vejle–Holstebro	540	
Jerne	Jne	2020	Esbjerg	Lunderskov–Esbjerg		
Jersie	Jsi	1983	Jersie	Køge Bay Line	2700	
Jerup	Jeu	1890	Jerup	Skagen Line		
Jyderup	Jy	1894	Jyderup	Northwest Line	1200	
Jyllingevej	Jyt	1949	Vanløse	Frederikssund Line	1000	
Jægersborg	Jæt	1936	Jægersborg	North Line; Nærum Line	3300	
Kagerup	Kgg	1880	Kagerup	Gribskov Line		
Kalundborg	Kb	1874	Kalundborg	Northwest Line	2000	
Kalundborg Øst	Kbø	2018	Kalundborg	Northwest Line		
Karinebæk	Kab	1991	Hornbæk	Hornbæk Line		
Karise	Kri	1879	Karise	East Line		
Karlslunde	Klu	1979	Karlslunde	Køge Bay Line	3400	
Kauslunde	Ka	1865	Kauslunde	Funen Main Line	60	
KB Hallen	Kbn	2005	Frederiksberg	Ring Line	3600	
Kibæk	Kæ	1881	Kibæk	Skanderborg–Skjern	220	
Kildebakke	Ket	1935	Søborg	Hareskov Line	1800	
Kildedal	Kid	2000	Måløv	Frederikssund Line		
Kildekrog	Kil	1916				
Kirke Eskilstrup	Kek	1901	Kirke Eskilstrup	Tølløse Line		
Klampenborg	Kl	1863	Klampenborg	Coast Line; Klampenborg Line	2600	
Klinkby	Kli	1899	Klinkby	Lemvig Line		
Klippinge	Klp	1879	Klippinge	East Line		
Kliplev	Kw	1901	Kliplev	Sønderborg Line	30	
Knabstrup	Ks	1874	Knabstrup Stationsby	Northwest Line	270	
Kokkedal	Ok	1906	Kokkedal	Coast Line	6100	
Kolding	Kd	1866	Kolding	Fredericia–Padborg	5200	
Kolind	Ko	1876	Kolind	Grenaa Line		
Kongsvang	Kvg	1994	Viby J	Odder Line		
Korsør	Kø	1856	Korsør	West Line	2800	
Kratbjerg	Krb	2008	Fredensborg	Little North Line		
Kregme	Krf	1897	Kregme	Frederiksværk Line		
Kvissel	Kv	1871	Kvissel	Vendsyssel Line	40	
Kvistgård	Kå	1864	Kvistgård	Little North Line		
Kvægtorvet	Kvæ	2004	Hjørring	Hirtshals Line		
Kværndrup	Kvs	1876	Kværndrup	Svendborg Line	250	
København H	Kh	1911	Copenhagen	Coast Line; Copenhagen–Ringsted Line; Øresund Line; West Line	103600	
København Syd	Nel	2006	Valby	Copenhagen–Ringsted Line; Øresund Line; Ring Line	5500	named Ny Ellebjerg until 2023
Københavns Lufthavn	Cph	1998	Copenhagen Airport	Øresund Line	22700	
Køge	Kj	1870	Køge	East Line; Køge Bay Line; Little South Line	11400	
Køge Nord	Kjn	2019	Køge	Copenhagen–Ringsted Line; Køge Bay Line		
Langgade	Vat	1941	Valby	Frederikssund Line		
Langerød	Lrt	1864	Langerød	Little North Line		
Langeskov	Lv	1869	Langeskov	Funen Main Line		closed 1977–2015
Langå	Lg	1862	Langå	Aarhus–Randers; Langå–Struer	1000	
Laven	La	1871	Laven	Skanderborg–Skjern	140	
Lejre	Lj	1874	Lejre	Northwest Line	1300	
Lem	Lm	1875	Lem	Esbjerg–Struer	150	
Lemvig	Lmv	1879	Lemvig	Lemvig Line		
Lille Kregme	Llk	1897	Lille Kregme	Frederiksværk Line		
Lille Linde	Lli	1930	Lille Linde	East Line		closed 1983–1992
Lille Skensved	Lw	1908	Lille Skensved	Little South Line	470	
Lilleheden	Lhe	1940	Hirtshals	Hirtshals Line		closed 1943–1946
Lindholm	Lih	2002	Nørresundby	Vendsyssel Line; Aalborg Airport Line	600	
Lundby	Lu	1870	Lundby	South Line	450	
Lunde	Luj	1903	Lunde	Varde–Nørre Nebel		
Lunderskov	Lk	1866	Lunderskov	Fredericia–Padborg; Lunderskov–Esbjerg	580	
Lyngby	Ly	1863	Kongens Lyngby	North Line	22300	
Lyngby Lokal	Lyl	1932	Kongens Lyngby	Nærum Line		
Lyngs	Ln	1882	Lyngs	Thy Line	50	
Lystrup	Lp	1877	Lystrup	Grenaa Line		
Løftgård	Løt	1945		Varde–Nørre Nebel		
Løgten	Lt	1877	Løgten	Grenaa Line		
Malling	Mal	1884	Malling	Odder Line		
Malmparken	Mpt	1989	Ballerup	Frederikssund Line	3800	
Maribo	Mrb	1874	Maribo	Lolland Line		
Marienlyst	Mar	1906	Helsingør	Hornbæk Line		
Melby	Mel	1916	Melby	Frederiksværk Line		
Middelfart	Md	1865	Middelfart	Funen Main Line	3000	
Mølleparken	Mpk	1973	Mårslet	Odder Line		
Mørdrup	Møt	1934	Mørdrup	Little North Line		
Mørke	Mr	1877	Mørke	Grenaa Line		
Mørkøv	Mø	1874	Mørkøv	Northwest Line	570	
Måløv	Mw	1879	Måløv	Frederikssund Line	4500	
Mårslet	Mst	1884	Mårslet	Odder Line		
Mårum	Mmg	1880	Mårum	Gribskov Line		
Nakskov	Nsk	1874	Nakskov	Lolland Line		
Napstjært	Nap	1890	Napstjært	Skagen Line		closed 2005–2006
Nejrup	Net	1899	Nejrup	Lemvig Line		closed 1900–1924
Nivå	Ni	1897	Nivå	Coast Line	3800	
Nordhavn	Nht	1934	Østerbro, Copenhagen		18200	
Ny Hagested	Hgt	1899	Ny Hagested	Odsherred Line		
Nyborg	Ng	1865	Nyborg	Funen Main Line	4200	
Nykøbing Falster	Nf	1872	Nykøbing Falster	South Line; Lolland Line	3700	
Nykøbing Sjælland	Nks	1899	Nykøbing Sjælland	Odsherred Line		
Nyled	Ndt	1933	Nykøbing Sjælland	Odsherred Line		
Nyrup	Nyp	1901	Nyrup	Tølløse Line		
Nærum	Nær	1900	Nærum	Nærum Line		moved 1954
Næstved	Næ	1870	Næstved	South Line; Little South Line	8500	
Næstved Nord	Næn	1990	Næstved	Little South Line	400	
Nørgaardsvej	Nøv	2003	Kongens Lyngby	Nærum Line		
Nørre Alslev	Nv	1872	Nørre Alslev	South Line	800	
Nørre Asmindrup	Nam	1899	Nørre Asmindrup	Odsherred Line		
Nørre Nebel	Nbl	1903	Nørre Nebel	Varde–Nørre		
Nørre Aaby	Na	1865	Nørre Aaby	Funen Main Line	590	
Nørrebro	Nø	1930	Nørrebro, Copenhagen	Ring Line	12500	
Nørreport	Kn	1918	Indre By, Copenhagen		107800	
Nørrevænget	Nøt	2008	Tranbjerg	Odder Line		
Odder	Odd	1884	Odder	Odder Line		
Oddesund North	No	1882	Oddesund	Thy Line	10	
Odense	Od	1865	Odense	Funen Main Line; Svendborg Line	17600	
Odense Sygehus	Oss	1981	Odense	Svendborg Line	420	
Oksbøl	Ox	1903	Oksbøl	Varde–Nørre Nebel		
Ordrup	Op	1924	Ordrup	Klampenborg Line	3700	
Outrup	Ou	1903	Outrup	Varde–Nørre Nebel		
Padborg	Pa	1864	Padborg	Fredericia–Padborg		
Pederstrup	Pds	1876	Pederstrup	Svendborg Line	80	
Peberholm	Phm	2000	Peberholm	Øresund Line		
Peter Bangs Vej	Pbt	1941	Frederiksberg	Frederikssund Line	2600	
Pårup	Ppg	1896	Pårup	Gribskov Line		
Ramme	Ram	1879	Ramme	Lemvig Line		
Randers	Rd	1862	Randers	Aarhus–Randers; Randers–Aalborg	2700	
Ravnholm	Rvh	1900	Ravnholm	Nærum Line		
Regstrup	Rt	1874	Regstrup	Northwest Line	370	
Rejsby	Rej	1887	Rejsby	Bramming–Tønder	110	
Ribe	Rb	1875	Ribe	Bramming–Tønder	910	
Ribe Nørremark	Rbn	1985	Ribe	Bramming–Tønder	430	
Rimmen	Rim	1890	Nielstrup	Skagen Line		
Ringe	Re	1876	Ringe	Svendborg Line	1700	
Ringkøbing	Rj	1875	Ringkøbing	Esbjerg–Struer	680	
Ringsted	Rg	1856	Ringsted	Copenhagen–Ringsted; South Line; West Line	7100	
Rosenhøj	Rh	1972	Viby J	Odder Line		
Roskilde	Ro	1847	Roskilde	Little South Line; Northwest Line; West Line	28800	
Rude Havvej	Ruh	1982	Odder	Odder Line		
Rudme	Rus	1876	Rudme	Svendborg Line	50	
Ruds Vedby	Ruv	1901	Ruds Vedby	Tølløse Line		
Rungsted Kyst	Ru	1897	Rungsted	Coast Line	3000	
Ry	Ry	1871	Ry	Skanderborg–Skjern	1400	
Ryde	Ryd	1874	Ryde	Lolland Line		
Ryomgård	Rå	1876	Ryomgård	Grenaa Line		
Ryparken	Ryt	1926	Østerbro, Copenhagen	Hareskov Line; Ring Line	5600	
Rødekro	Rq	1864	Rødekro	Fredericia–Flensburg	470	
Rødkærsbro	Rk	1863	Rødkærsbro	Langå–Struer	350	
Rødovre	Rdo	1964	Rødovre	Høje Taastrup Line	6100	
Rødvig	Rdg	1879	Rødvig	East Line		
Rønland	Røn	1955	Rønland	Lemvig Line		
Sakskøbing	Sx	1874	Sakskøbing	Lolland Line		
Saltrup	Sag	1880	Saltrup	Gribskov Line		
Saunte	Sau	1906	Saunte	Hornbæk Line		
Sejstrup	Sej	1875	Sejstrup	Bramming–Tønder	80	
Sig	Is	1878	Sig	Esbjerg–Struer	60	
Silkeborg	Sl	1871	Silkeborg	Skanderborg–Skjern	2800	
Sindal	Sa	1871	Sindal	Vendsyssel Line	550	
Sinkbæk	Sit	1879		Lemvig Line		
Sjælør	Sjæ	1972	Valby	Køge Bay Line	6500	
Sjørring	Ri	1882	Sjørring	Thy Line	90	
Skagen	Sgb	1890	Skagen	Skagen Line		
Skalbjerg	Sc	1865	Skalbjerg	Funen Main Line	100	
Skalborg	Og	1899	Aalborg	Randers–Aalborg	140	closed 1972–2003
Skanderborg	Sd	1868	Skanderborg	Fredericia–Aarhus; Skanderborg–Skjern	3500	
Skellebjerg	Skl	1901	Skellebjerg	Tølløse Line		
Skibstrup	Skb	1906	Skibstrup	Hornbæk		
Skive	Sk	1864	Skive	Langå–Struer	1100	
Skjern	Sj	1875	Skjern	Esbjerg–Struer; Skanderborg–Skjern	1400	
Skodsborg	Så	1897	Skodsborg	Coast Line	1400	
Skolebakken	Bak	1979	Aarhus	Grenaa Line		
Skovbrynet	Skt	1930	Bagsværd	Hareskov Line	490	
Skovlunde	Sko	1905	Skovlunde	Frederikssund Line	4200	
Skærbæk	Æk	1887	Skærbæk	Bramming–Tønder	460	
Skævinge	Skv	1897	Skævinge	Frederiksværk Line		
Skødstrup	Øds	1878	Skødstrup	Grenaa Line		
Skørping	Sø	1869	Skørping	Randers–Aalborg	930	
Slagelse	Sg	1856	Slagelse	West Line; Tølløse Line	8400	
Slotspavillonen	Spg	1880	Hillerød	Gribskov Line		
Snedsted	Sne	1882	Snedsted	Thy Line	200	
Snekkersten	Sq	1879	Snekkersten	Coast Line; Little North Line	3600	
Solrød Strand	Sol	1979	Solrød Strand	Køge Bay Line	5100	
Sommerland Sjælland	Slt		Sommerland Sjælland	Odsherred Line		
Sorgenfri	Sft	1936	Sorgenfri	North Line	3100	
Sorø	So	1856	Sorø	West Line	2600	
Spangsbjerg	Esn	1985	Esbjerg	Esbjerg–Struer	410	
Sparkær	Sp	1865	Sparkær	Langå–Struer		closed 1979–2002
Sprogøvej	Ths	1982	Thyborøn	Lemvig Line		
Stengården	Sgt	1929	Bagsværd	Hareskov Line	1700	
Stenhus	Sht	1967	Holbæk	Odsherred Line		
Stenlille	Stl	1901	Stenlille	Tølløse Line		
Stenløse	St	1882	Stenløse	Frederikssund Line	4000	
Stenstrup	Sts	1876	Stenstrup	Svendborg Line	450	
Stenstrup Syd	Sis	1883	Stenstrup	Svendborg Line	70	
Stoholm	Sm	1865	Stoholm	Langå–Struer	320	
Store Heddinge	Sth	1879	Store Heddinge	East Line		
Store Merløse	Mrl	1901	Store Merløse	Tølløse Line		
Strandby	Stb	1924	Strandby	Skagen Line		
Strande	Sta	1899	Strande	Lemvig Line		
Struer	Str	1865	Struer	Esbjerg–Struer; Langå–Struer; Thy Line	1700	
Studsgård	Stu	1881	Studsgård	Skanderborg–Skjern	60	
Stæremosen	Stæ	1988	Gilleleje	Hornbæk Line		
Støvring	Sr	1869	Støvring	Randers–Aalborg	540	closed 1974–2003
Svanemøllen	Sam	1934	Østerbro, Copenhagen		14400	
Svebølle	Se	1874	Svebølle	Kalundborg Line	560	
Svejbæk	Sv	1871	Sejs-Svejbæk	Skanderborg–Skjern	180	
Svendborg	Svg	1876	Svendborg	Svendborg Line	2400	
Svendborg Vest	Svv	1982	Svendborg	Svendborg Line	450	
Svenstrup	Sn	1872	Svenstrup	Randers–Aalborg	460	closed 1972–2003
Svinninge	Sng	1899	Svinninge	Odsherred Line		
Sydhavn	Syv	1972	Kongens Enghave, Copenhagen		5000	
Søborg	Søb	1916	Søborg	Hornbæk Line		
Søllested	Søl	1874	Søllested	Lolland Line		
Sønderborg	Sdb	1901	Sønderborg	Sønderborg Line	460	
Tarm	Ta	1875	Tarm	Esbjerg–Struer	250	
Taulov	Tl	1866	Taulov	Fredericia–Flensburg	130	
Teglgårdsvej	Teg	2004	Hjørring	Hirtshals Line		
Thisted	Ti	1881	Thisted	Thy Line	550	
Thorsager	Tg	1877	Thorsager	Grenaa Line		closed 1971–2019
Thyborøn	Thb	1924	Thyborøn	Lemvig Line		
Thyborøn Kirke	Tht	1990	Thyborøn	Lemvig Line		
Thyregod	Ty	1914	Thyregod	Vejle–Holstebro	270	
Tim	Tm	1875	Tim	Esbjerg–Struer	90	
Tinglev	Te	1864	Tinglev	Fredericia–Flensburg; Tinglev–Sønderborg	290	
Tistrup	Tr	1875	Tistrup	Esbjerg–Struer	200	
Tisvildeleje	Tvl	1924	Tisvildeleje	Gribskov Line		
Tjæreborg	Tb	1874	Tjæreborg	Lunderskov–Esbjerg	200	
Tokkerup	Tok	1879	Tokkerup	East Line		
Tolne	To	1873	Tolne	Vendsyssel Line	70	
Tommerup	Tp	1876	Tommerup Stationsby	Funen Main Line	390	
Tornby	Tor	1925	Tornby	Hirtshals Line		
Torsøvej	Tov	1979	Risskov, Aarhus	Grenaa Line		
Tranbjerg	Trg	1884	Tranbjerg	Odder Line		
Trekroner	Trk	1988	Trekroner, Roskilde	West Line	6100	
Troldebakkerne		2021	Helsinge	Gribskov Line		
Troldhede	Td	1881	Troldhede	Skanderborg–Skjern	130	
Trustrup	Tu	1886	Trustrup	Grenaa Line		
Tureby	Th	1870	Algestrup	Little South Line	300	
Tølløse	Tø	1874	Tølløse	Northwest Line; Tølløse Line	2500	
Tønder	Tdr	1887	Tønder	Bramming–Tønder	250	
Tønder Nord	Trn		Tønder	Bramming–Tønder	230	
Tårnby	Tåt	1998	Tårnby	Øresund Line	5400	
Taastrup	Tå	1847	Taastrup	Høje Taastrup Line	7300	
Uglev	Ul	1882	Uglev	Thy Line	60	
Ulfborg	Uf	1875	Ulfborg	Esbjerg–Struer	240	
Ulstrup	Up	1868	Ulstrup	Langå–Struer	320	
Valby	Val	1847	Valby	Frederikssund Line; Høje Taastrup Line; West Line	26000	closed 1864–1911
Vallensbæk	Vlb	1972	Vallensbæk	Køge Bay Line	4300	
Vallø			Vallø	East Line		
Vamdrup	Vm	1866	Vamdrup	Fredericia–Padborg	360	
Vangede	Ang	1906	Vangede	Hareskov Line	2900	
Vanløse	Van	1898	Vanløse, Copenhagen	Frederikssund Line; Ring Line	13100	
Varde	Va	1874	Varde	Esbjerg–Struer; Varde–Nørre Nebel	920	
Varde Kaserne	Vka		Varde	Esbjerg–Struer	190	
Varde Nord	Vno	1984	Varde	Esbjerg–Struer	140	
Varde Vest	Vav	1903	Varde	Varde–Nørre Nebel		
Varpelev	Vap	1881	Varpelev	East Line		closed 1983–1989
Vedbæk	Vb	1897	Vedbæk	Coast Line	2100	
Vedde	Ved	1901	Vedde	Tølløse Line		
Vejby	Vej	1924	Vejby	Gribskov Line		
Vejen	Vn	1874	Vejen	Lunderskov–Esbjerg	1400	
Vejle	Vj	1868	Vejle	Fredericia–Aarhus; Vejle–Holstebro	6600	
Vejle Sygehus	Vjs	1993	Vejle	Vejle–Holstebro	50	
Veksø	Vs	1879	Veksø	Frederikssund Line	1600	
Vellingshøj	Vlh	1925	Hjørring	Hirtshals Line		
Vemb	Vem	1875	Vemb	Esbjerg–Struer; Lemvig Line	270	
Vesterport	Vpt	1934	Copenhagen	Boulevard Line	23200	
Vestre Strandallé	Vsa		Risskov, Aarhus	Grenaa Line		
Vibehus	Vif	1916	Hundested	Frederiksværk Line		
Viborg	Vg	1863	Viborg	Langå–Struer	2500	
Viby Jylland	Vi	1884	Viby, Aarhus	Fredericia–Aarhus; Odder Line	750	
Viby Sjælland	Vy	1859	Viby	West Line	2600	
Victoria Street	Vic		Vejlby	Lemvig Line		
Vidstrup	Vid	1925	Vidstrup	Hirtshals Line		
Vig	Vig	1899	Vig	Odsherred Line		
Vigerslev Allé	Vgt	2005	Vigerslev, Copenhagen	Ring Line	4400	
Vildbjerg	Id	1904	Vildbjerg	Vejle–Holstebro	620	
Vilhelmsborg	Vh	1989		Odder Line		
Vinderup	Vp	1865	Vinderup	Langå–Struer	220	
Vipperød	Pe	1874	Vipperød	Northwest Line	860	
Virum	Vir	1928	Virum	North Line	3600	
Visby	Vis	1887	Visby	Bramming–Tønder	60	
Vojens	Oj	1864	Vojens	Fredericia–Padborg	570	
Vordingborg	Vo	1870	Vordingborg	South Line	3100	
Vrist	Vri	1961	Vrist	Lemvig Line		
Vrøgum	Vrø	1903	Øster Vrøgum	Varde–Nørre Nebel		
Vrå	Vr	1871	Vrå	Vendsyssel Line	640	
Værløse	Vær	1906	Værløse	Hareskov Line	4500	
Ydby	Yd	1886	Ydby	Thy Line	30	
Ølby	Ølb	1983	Ølby Lyng	Køge Bay Line; Little South Line	5600	
Ølgod	Øg	1875	Ølgod	Esbjerg–Struer	440	
Øllegårdsvej	Øgt	1972	Viby, Aarhus	Odder Line		
Ølsted	Øls	1897	Ølsted	Frederiksværk Line		
Ølstykke	Øl	1879	Ølstykke-Stenløse	Frederikssund Line	3500	
Ørby	Øbg	1924	Ørby	Gribskov Line		
Ørestad	Øre	2000	Ørestad, Copenhagen	Øresund Line	7500	
Ørholm	Ørh	1900	Ørholm	Nærum Line		
Østbanetorvet	Øs	1877	Aarhus	Grenaa Line		
Øster Toreby	Øto	1996	Øster Toreby	Lolland Line		
Østerbjerg	Øsf	1916	Tømmerup	Frederiksværk Line		
Østerport	Kk	1897	Copenhagen	Boulevard Line	28600	
Aalborg	Ab	1869	Aalborg	Randers–Aalborg; Vendsyssel Line	7500	
Aalborg Airport	Abl	2020	Aalborg Airport	Aalborg Airport Line		
Aalborg Vestby	Abv	2003	Aalborg	Vendsyssel Line	580	
Ålbæk	Ålb	1890	Ålbæk	Skagen Line		
Ålholm	Ålm	2005	Valby, Copenhagen	Ring Line		
Ålsgårde	Aal	1906	Ålsgårde	Hornbæk Line		
Åmarken	Åm	1972	Hvidovre	Køge Bay Line	1800	
Aarhus H	Ar	1927	Aarhus	Fredericia–Aarhus; Aarhus–Randers; Grenaa Line; Odder Line	20600	
Årslev	Ås	1876	Årslev	Svendborg Line	530	
Aarup	Ap	1865	Aarup	Funen Main Line	480	

== See also ==
- Rail transport in Europe
- Transportation in Denmark
- Rail transport in Denmark
