= Mørdrup railway halt =

Railway halt in North Zealand, Denmark

Mørdrup

General information
- Location: Mosehusvej, Mørdrup; 3060 Espergærde; Helsingør Municipality; Denmark
- Coordinates: 56°00′07.5″N 12°31′56.5″E
- Elevation: 27.3 metres (90 ft)
- Owner: Hovedstadens Lokalbaner
- Operator: Lokaltog
- Line: Little North Line
- Platforms: 1
- Tracks: 1

History
- Opened: 1934

Services
Preceding station	Lokaltog	Following station
Snekkersten towards Helsingør	Little North Line Local train	Kvistgård towards Hillerød
Location

Mørdrup halt is a railway halt serving the village of Mørdrup in the western part of Espergærde south of the city of Helsingør in North Zealand, Denmark.

The halt is located on the Little North Line from Helsingør to Hillerød. The train services are currently operated by the railway company Lokaltog which runs frequent local train services between Helsingør station and Hillerød station.

== See also ==
- List of railway stations in Denmark
