= Kvistgård =

- Town
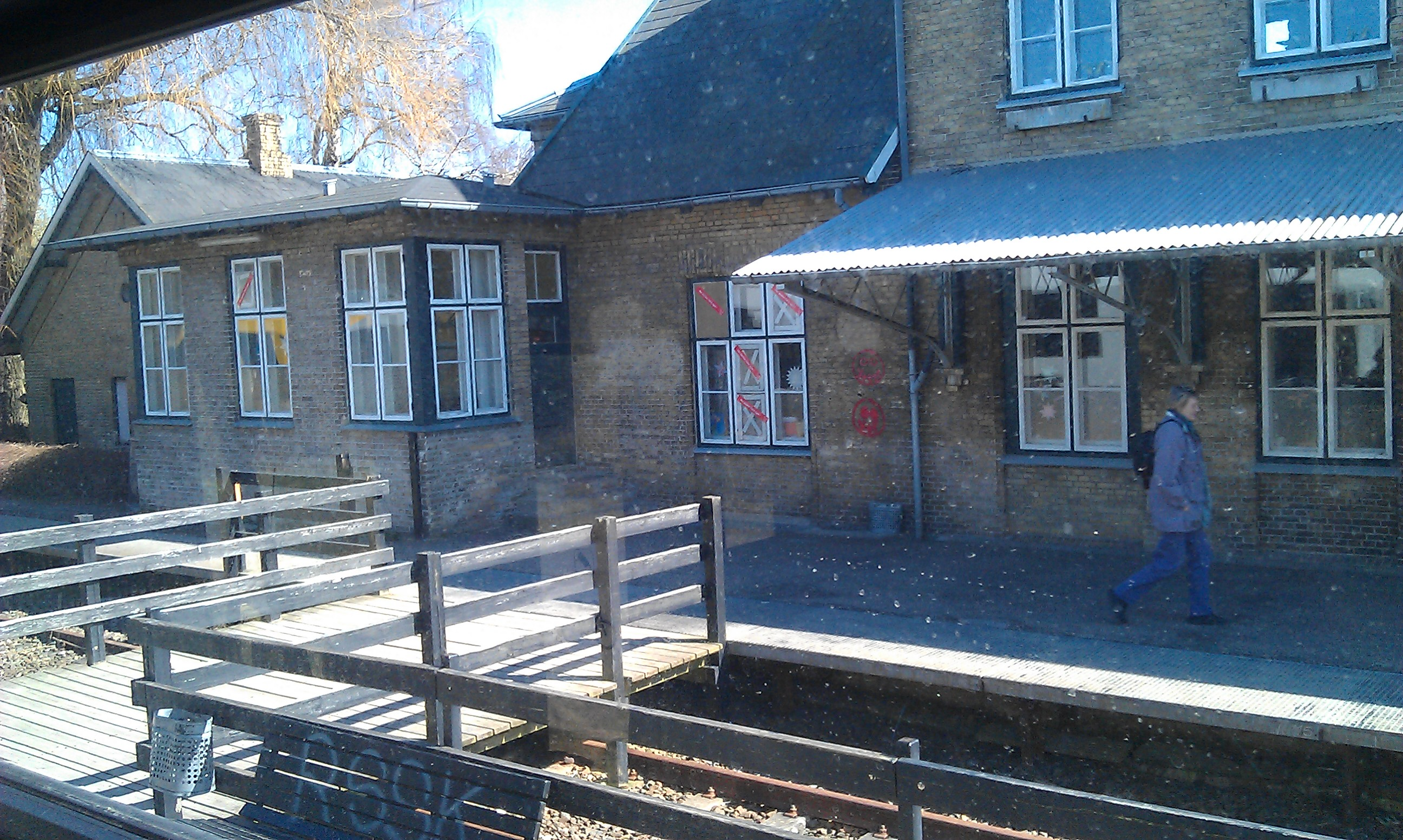

- Location in Denmark Kvistgård (Capital Region)
- Coordinates: 55°59′N 12°30′E
- Country: Denmark
- Region: Capital (Hovedstaden)
- Municipality: Helsingør

Area
  - Urban: 1.7 km^{2} (0.66 sq mi)

Population (2026)
  - Urban: 1,235
  - Urban density: 730/km^{2} (1,900/sq mi)
- Time zone: UTC+1 (CET)
  - Summer (DST): UTC+2 (CEST)
- Postal code: 3490 Kvistgård

Kvistgård is a small town in the southwestern outskirts of Helsingør, Helsingør Municipality, some 40 kilometres north of Copenhagen, Denmark. It is situated in the fork between the Helsingør Motorway to the east, separating it from Espergærde, and Helsingørsvej (part of National route 9) to the west. Kvistgård railway station is a stop on the Lille North railway line between Helsingør and Hillerød. As of 2026, Kvistgård has a population of 1,235.

== History ==
The first known reference to the village of Nyrup (Nuthorp) is in a letter from Pope Alexander III dated 2 November 1178. The village belonged to Esrum Abbey until the Reformation. In 1497 it consisted of 10 farms and in 1681 of six farms and four houses. From 1674 until 1712 the residence of the forester of Kronborg County was in Nyrup. After that he resided at Gurrehus. Before Fredensborg was built, the king also had a hunting lodge at Nyrup. It was located a little north of the village. Nyrup was located at the site where the two royal roads (kongeveje) from Frederiksborg and Hirschholm Palace met before continuing to Helsingør and Kronborg. The village was therefore from at least the beginning of the 18th century and probably much earlier home to an inn.

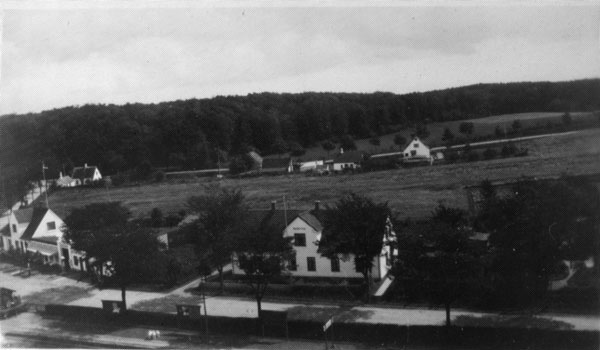
The area east of Kvistgård railway station in 1928: Still open countryside

Kvistgård developed around Kvistgård railway station which opened on the new North Line in 1868. The town was named after the farm Kvistgård (formerly Qvistgaard) on whose land it was built. The farmhouse was subsequently referred to as Kvistgård Hovedgård (literally "Kvistgård Manor") to distinguish it from the station and settlement even if it had never been a manor house. The land originally belonged to the hamlet of Munkegaarde but after the agricultural reforms of the 1780s came under Nyrup. The first new buildings were in a housing development built by the railway company for railway workers. In the mid-1870s, Ludvig Lichtenberg, owner of Kvistgård Hovedgård, established Kvistgård Brickyards (Kvistgård Teglværk). Havreholm Fabrikker A/S a manufacturer of wood products, moved to a new site next to Kvistgård Station after a fire in 1897. When these enterprises closed, new companies took over their premises. The area remained relatively open until the middle of the 20th century but was gradually surrounded by residential neighbourhoods, workshops, a few shops and new industries.

== Landmarks ==
Kvistgård's former main building today houses the only Rudolf Steiner school in the North Zealand area. The buildings have been expanded and altered several times. All of the land has been sold off. Some of it has been laid out as allotments since 1975.

Nyrup boasts two English-style country houses from the 1820s, Fairyhill and Claythorpe. They were built by Charles Fenwick, an English born businessman and General council. Fairyhill was listed in 1959. Nyrupgaard now houses the head office of the Noa Noa clothing company. Companies in Kvistgård include Bavarian Nordic, and the Barslund A/S construction and engineering company. The local parish church is in Tikøb.

== Surroundings ==
Kvistgård is surrounded by several small forests. Nyrup Hegn and Kronborg Hegn are located north of the town and Kelleris Hegn and Egebljsvang are to the west.

== Transport ==
Kvistgård is served by Kvistgård railway station on the Little North railway line between Helsingør and Hillerød. Trains are operated by the railway company Lokaltog with frequencies of twice an hour in the daytime on week days and once an hour in the evening and on weekends.

The Helsingør Motorway provides a fast connection to Copenhagen. Helsingørsvej, part of National route 6, connects Kvistgård to Fredensborg, Hillerød, Slangerup, and Roskilde.
