= Grønholt railway halt =

Railway halt in North Zealand, Denmark

Grønholt
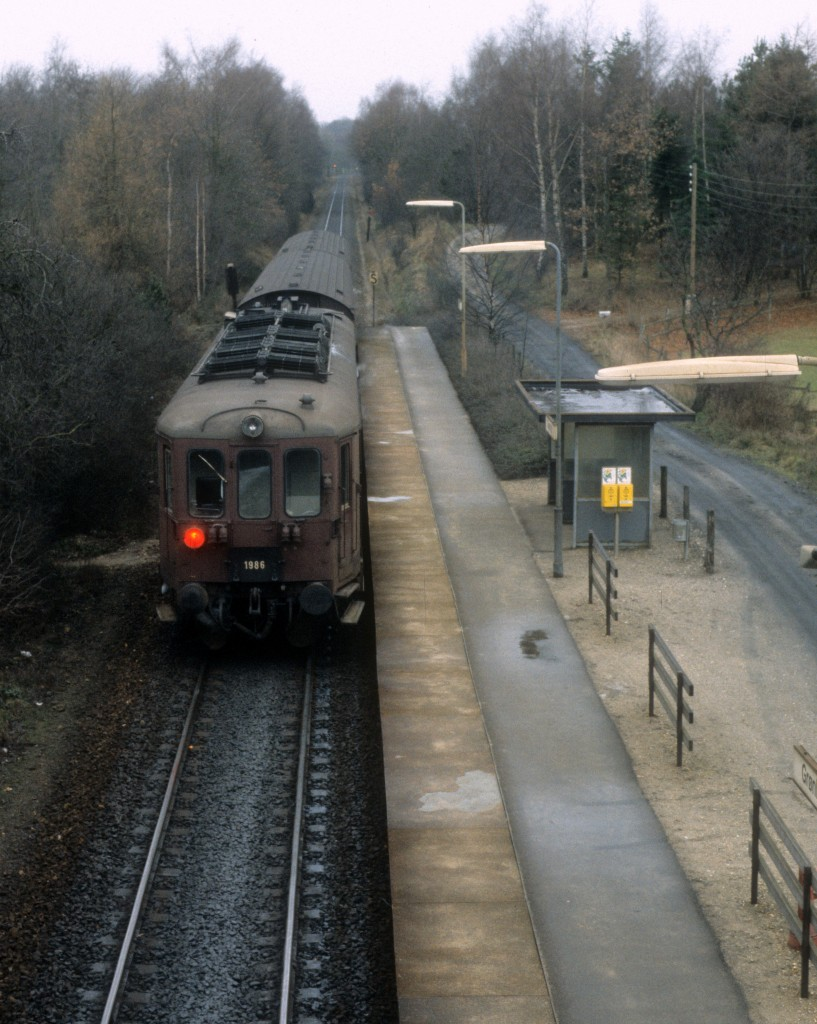
- Grønholt halt in 1983

General information
- Location: Grønholtvangen; 3480 Fredensborg; Fredensborg Municipality; Denmark
- Coordinates: 55°57′9.37″N 12°22′13.19″E
- Elevation: 29.8 metres (98 ft)
- Owner: Hovedstadens Lokalbaner
- Operator: Lokaltog
- Line: Little North Line
- Platforms: 1
- Tracks: 1

Services
Preceding station	Lokaltog	Following station
Kratbjerg towards Helsingør	Little North Line Local train	Hillerød Terminus
Location

Grønholt halt is a railway halt near the village of Grønholt near the town of Hillerød in North Zealand, Denmark.

The halt is located on the Little North Line from Helsingør to Hillerød. The train services are currently operated by the railway company Lokaltog which runs frequent local train services between Helsingør station and Hillerød station.

== See also ==
- List of railway stations in Denmark
