= Kratbjerg railway halt =

Railway halt in North Zealand, Denmark

Kratbjerg
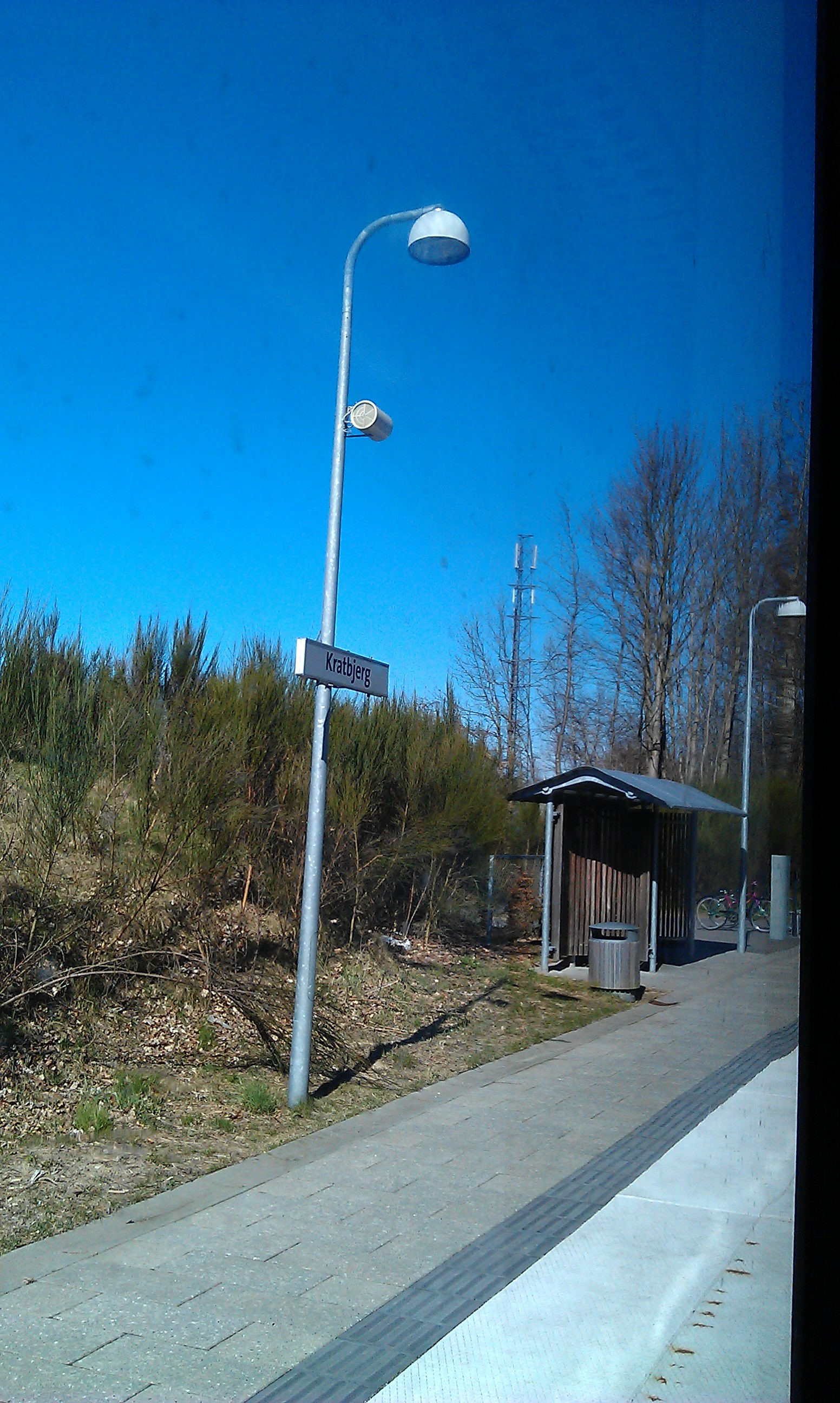
- Kratbjerg halt in 2012

General information
- Location: 3480 Fredensborg; Fredensborg Municipality; Denmark
- Coordinates: 55°58′4″N 12°23′36″E
- Elevation: 24.8 metres (81 ft)
- Owner: Hovedstadens Lokalbaner
- Operator: Lokaltog
- Line: Little North Line
- Platforms: 1
- Tracks: 1

Services
| Preceding station | Lokaltog | Following station |
|---|---|---|
| Fredensborg towards Helsingør | Little North Line Local train | Grønholt towards Hillerød |
Location

Kratbjerg halt is a railway halt serving the district of Kratbjerg in the western part of the town of Fredensborg in North Zealand, Denmark.

The halt is located on the Little North Line from Helsingør to Hillerød. The train services are currently operated by the railway company Lokaltog which runs frequent local train services between Helsingør station and Hillerød station.

== See also ==
- List of railway stations in Denmark
- Rail transport in Denmark
