= Langerød railway halt =

Railway halt in North Zealand, Denmark

Langerød
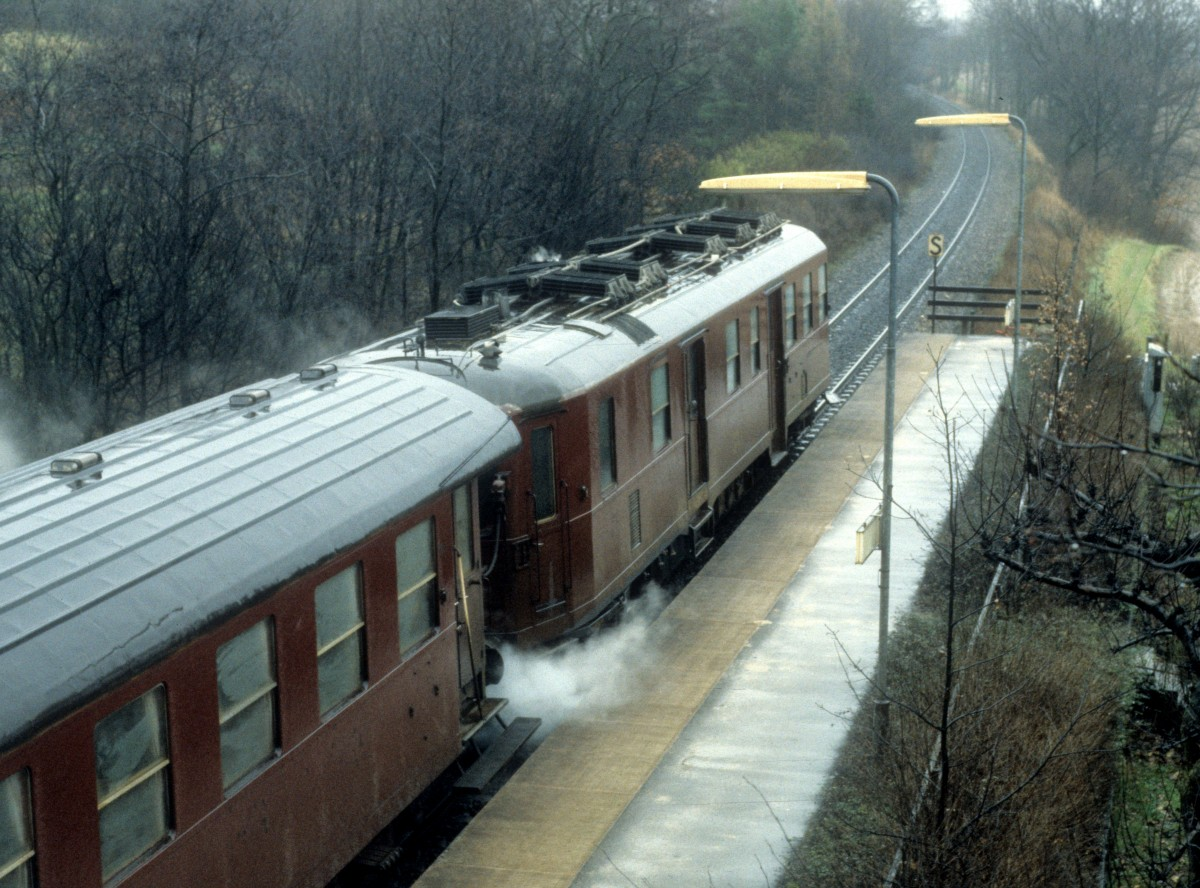
- Langerød halt in 1983

General information
- Location: Højsagervej; 3480 Fredensborg; Fredensborg Municipality; Denmark
- Coordinates: 55°58′52.4″N 12°27′04″E
- Elevation: 44.1 metres (145 ft)
- Owner: Hovedstadens Lokalbaner
- Operator: Lokaltog
- Line: Little North Line
- Platforms: 1
- Tracks: 1

Services
Preceding station	Lokaltog	Following station
Kvistgård towards Helsingør	Little North Line Local train	Fredensborg towards Hillerød
Location

Langerød halt is a railway halt serving the settlement of Langerød in North Zealand, Denmark.

The halt is located on the Little North Line from Helsingør to Hillerød. The train services are currently operated by the railway company Lokaltog which runs frequent local train services between Helsingør station and Hillerød station.

== See also ==
- List of railway stations in Denmark
- Rail transport in Denmark
