= Royal waiting room =

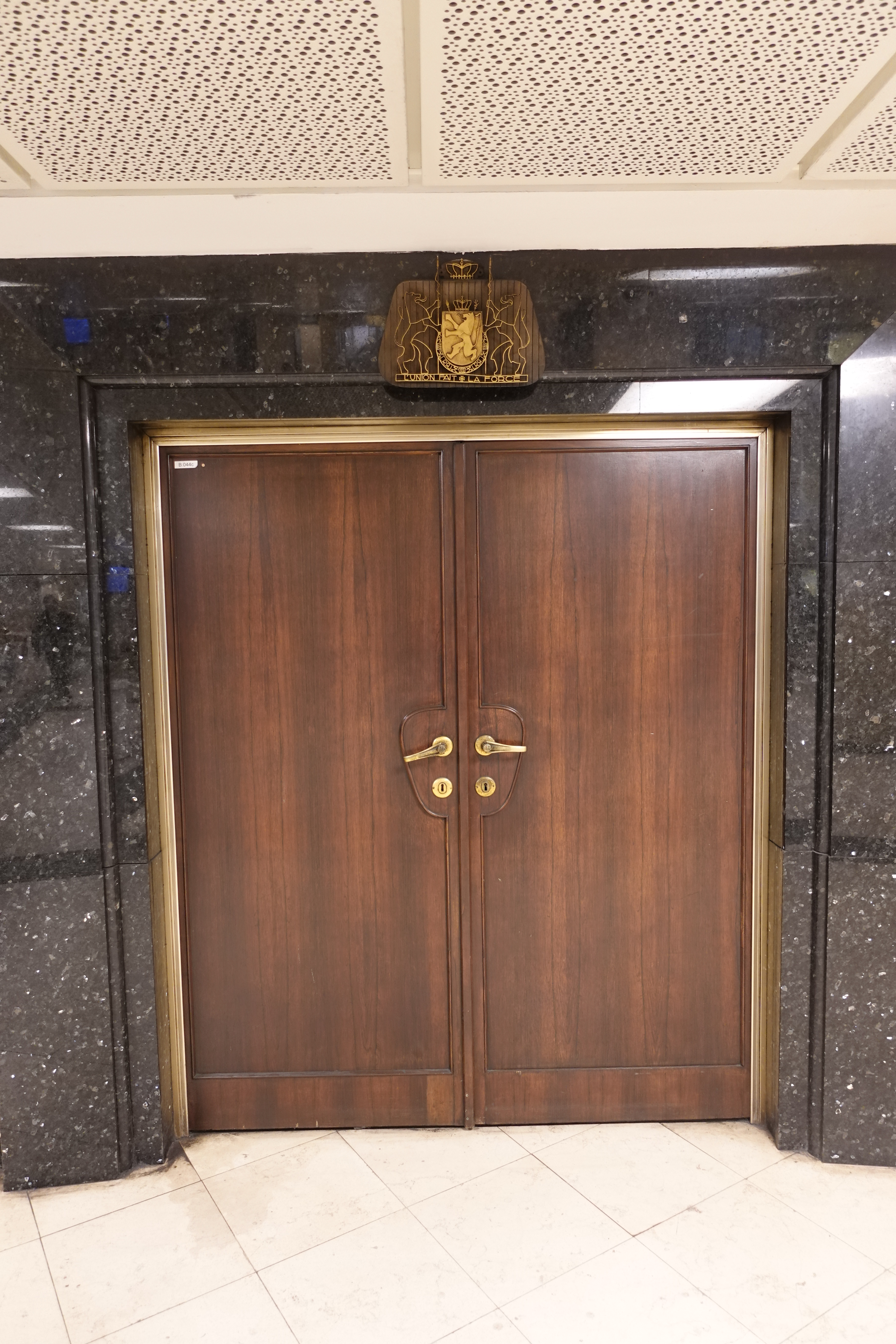
Door of the royal waiting room in Brussels-Central railway station

A royal waiting room is a space at a train station intended for use by members of a royal family when traveling by train. According to protocol, a monarch should not have to wait, so that when they arrive, all arrangements are already in place. However, this is not always feasible when traveling by train. Because stations are required for regular services, it is not always possible for royal trains to be placed at platforms in advance. For this reason, some stations are equipped with a waiting room offering greater comfort and privacy. These facilities are often found in stations located near royal palaces.

Since members of royal families began traveling by train in the second half of the 19th century, both private railroad cars for royal use and dedicated waiting rooms were introduced. When prominent new stations were constructed near royal residences during this period, royal waiting rooms were often incorporated into their design.

== Belgium ==
Brussels-Central railway station in Belgium still has a royal waiting room. The room is rarely used by the Belgian monarchy, and its ownership has been transferred to the National Railway Company of Belgium. Since then, the room has also been used for lectures and other socio-cultural activities. Other stations in Belgium with royal waiting rooms were Brussels-North railway station and Brussels-South railway station.

== Denmark ==
In Denmark, three stations have a royal waiting room:

- Copenhagen Central Station
- Fredensborg railway station
- Gråsten railway station (no longer in use)

== Finland ==
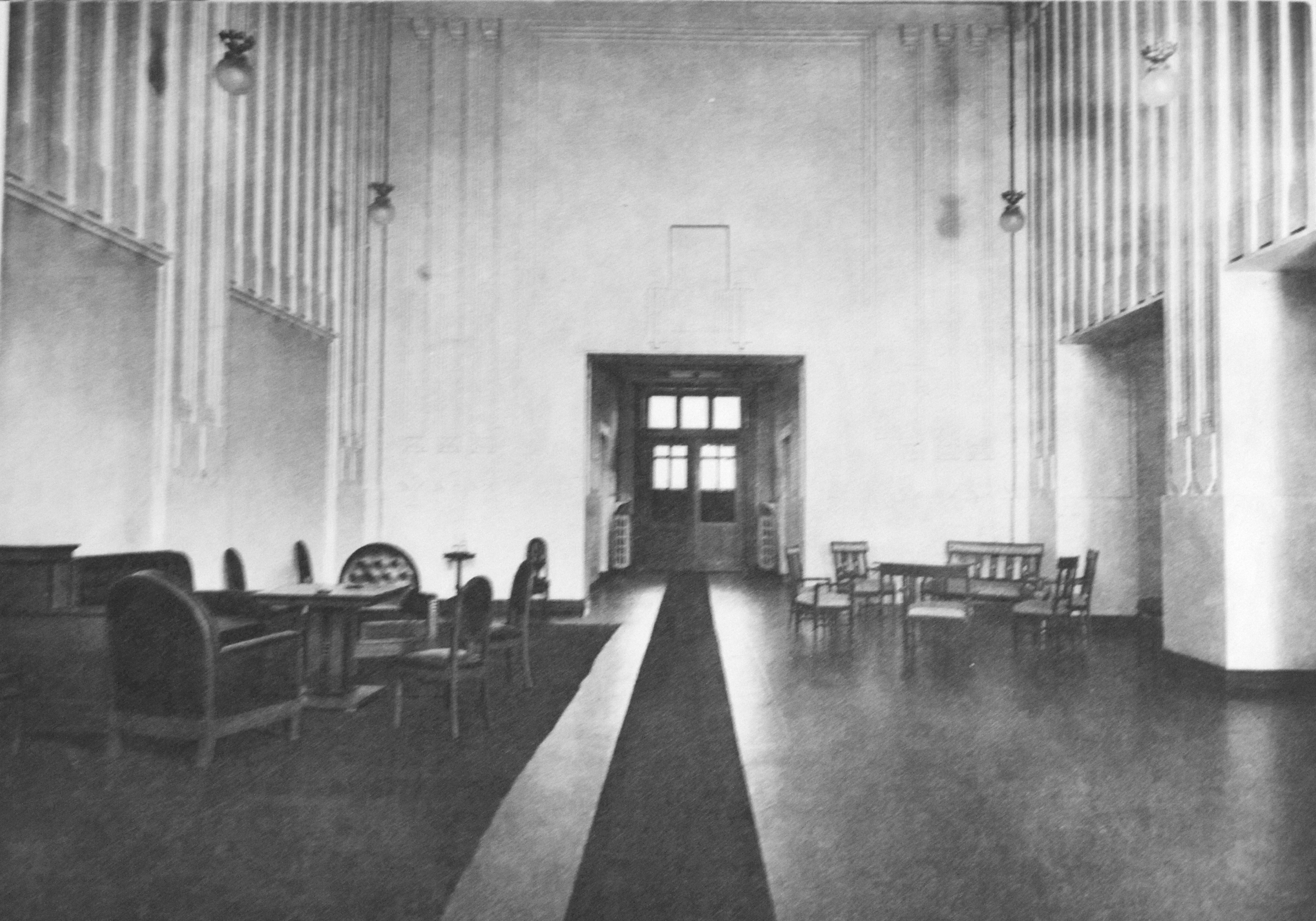
The presidential lounge at the Helsinki Central Station, originally designed as a royal waiting room

In Finland, there is one railway station with a royal waiting room. The Helsinki Central Station in central Helsinki, the busiest railway station in Finland, houses a 50-square-metre (540 sq ft) waiting lounge exclusively for the use of the President of Finland and their official guests.

The lounge was completed in 1911 and was originally intended as a royal waiting room for the Emperor of Russia, but the First World War delayed its official inauguration to 1919, at which point it had been converted into a temporary military hospital, and was afterwards given to the use of the Finnish President.

The lounge, featuring furniture designed by Eliel Saarinen, has two entrances, a bigger one leading in from Rautatientori Square and a smaller one leading in from the main station hall. The exterior entrance to the lounge features two sculptures by the Norwegian sculptor Hans Uthuslien, resembling smaller versions of the Lyhdynkantajat sculptures. Emperor Nicholas II of Russia entered the Rautatientori Square on the last ever imperial visit to the Grand Duchy of Finland through the lounge. After Finland became independent the lounge was reserved for the President of Finland.

== Germany ==
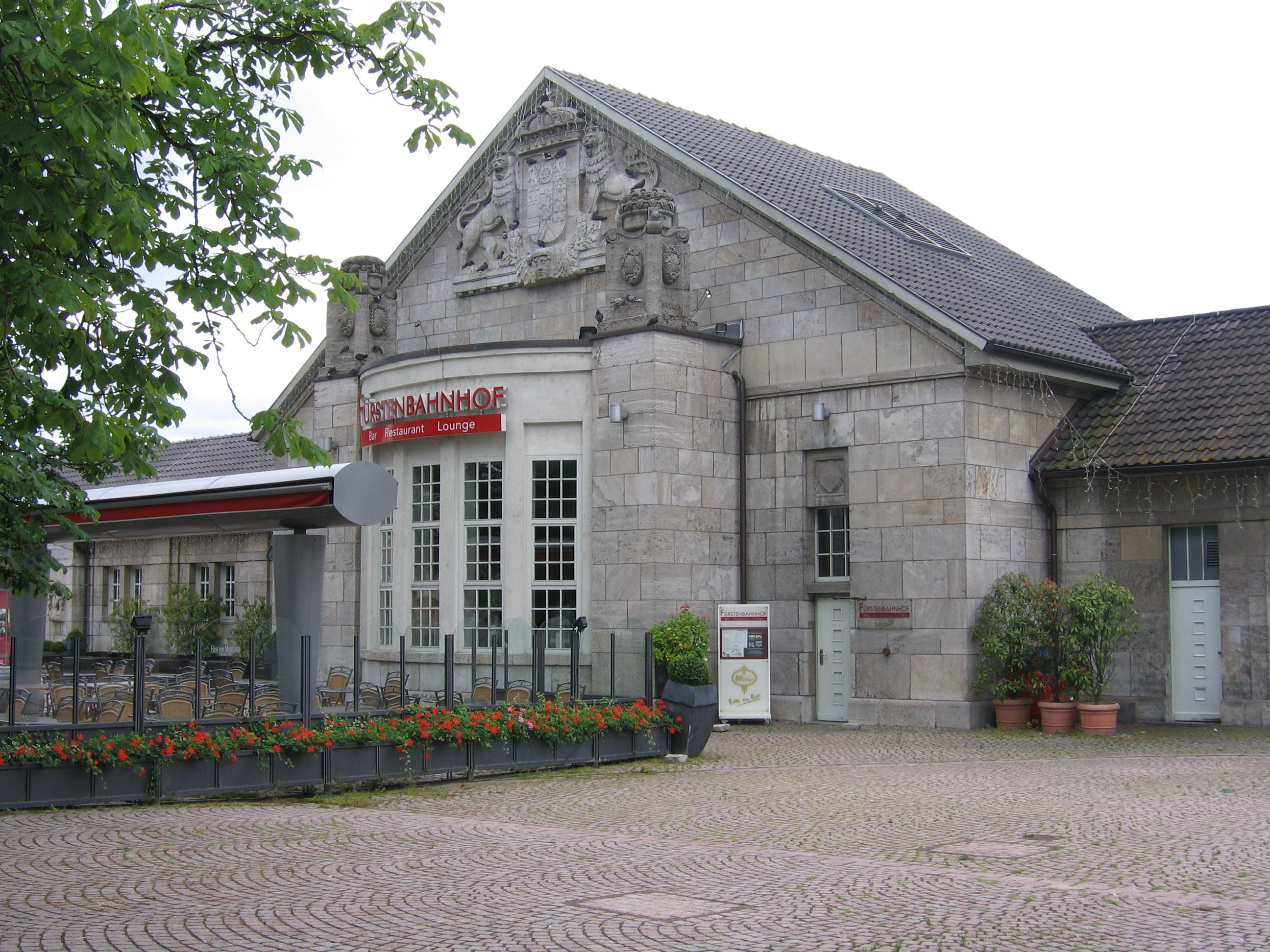
The Fürstenbahnhof at Darmstadt Hauptbahnhof, formerly the reception building and waiting room for the House of Hesse-Darmstadt and their guests

The German Empire had a widespread network of royal waiting rooms (Fürstenzimmern), private royal station entrances, and in a few cases entire royal private railway stations (Fürstenbahnhöfe) to serve the royal families of the various German kingdoms. These were found near the residences of noble families, in major cities, and in spa towns and other resorts. These lost their significance after the founding of the German Republic, but some survive in modern railway station buildings, often converted into waiting rooms or food-service spaces.

== The Netherlands ==
The royal waiting rooms in the Netherlands are owned by Nederlandse Spoorwegen (Dutch Railways), not by the Dutch monarchy. They are part of the country's cultural heritage, so sometimes the rooms are opened for meetings, receptions or viewings. The following Dutch stations have or had a royal waiting room:

- Amsterdam Centraal (1889–present; near Royal Palace of Amsterdam; entrance side doors permanently opened with glass facades added for public viewing in 2018)
- Baarn (1874–present; near Soestdijk Palace; completely restored in May 2014)
- Den Haag HS (1893–present; near Huis ten Bosch and Noordeinde Palace; consists of seven rooms with a spacious staircase and vestibule)
- Den Haag SS (1870–1973; room dismantled and stored in 1973; on display in the Railway Museum (Netherlands) in Utrecht since the early 2000s)
- Apeldoorn (1876–1976; near Het Loo Palace; room demolished in 1976)
- Vlissingen (1894–1944; ferry service to the United Kingdom; destroyed in a bombing raid in 1944)
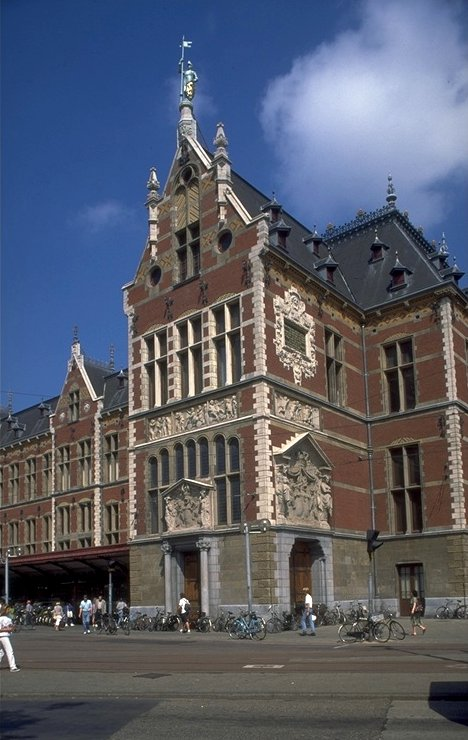
Exterior of the royal pavilion of Amsterdam Centraal station

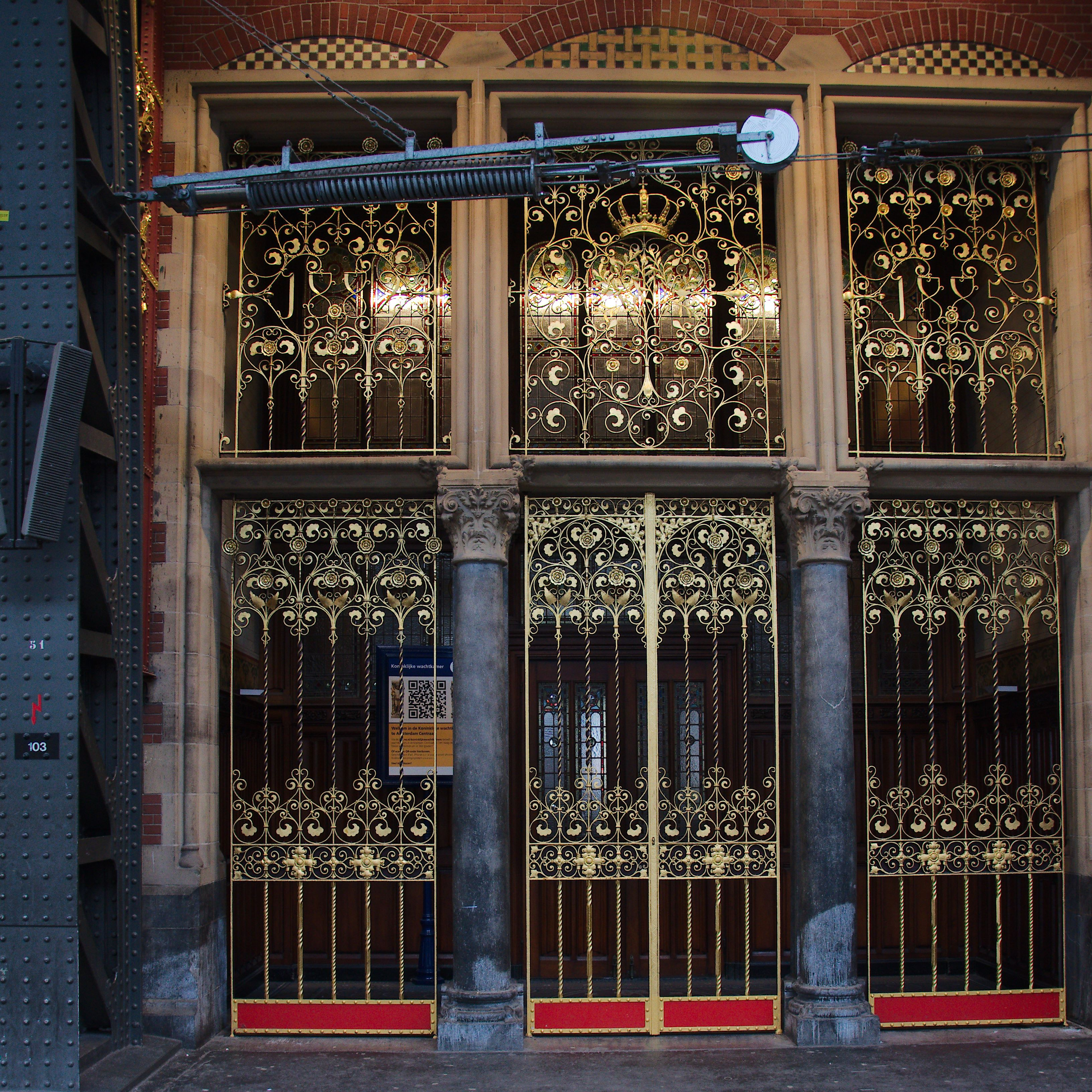
Entrance to the royal waiting room at Amsterdam Centraal station

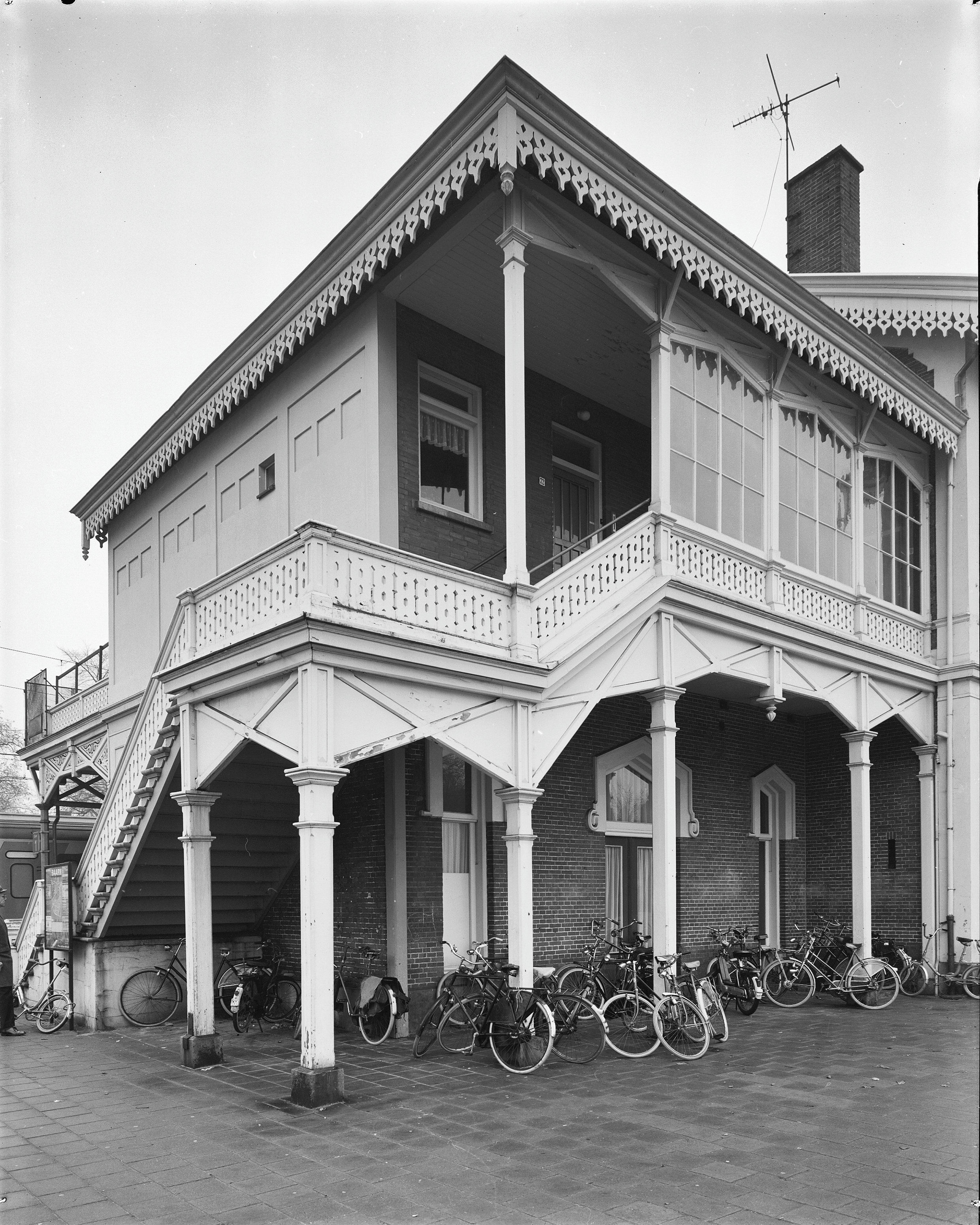
Exterior of the royal waiting room at Baarn railway station

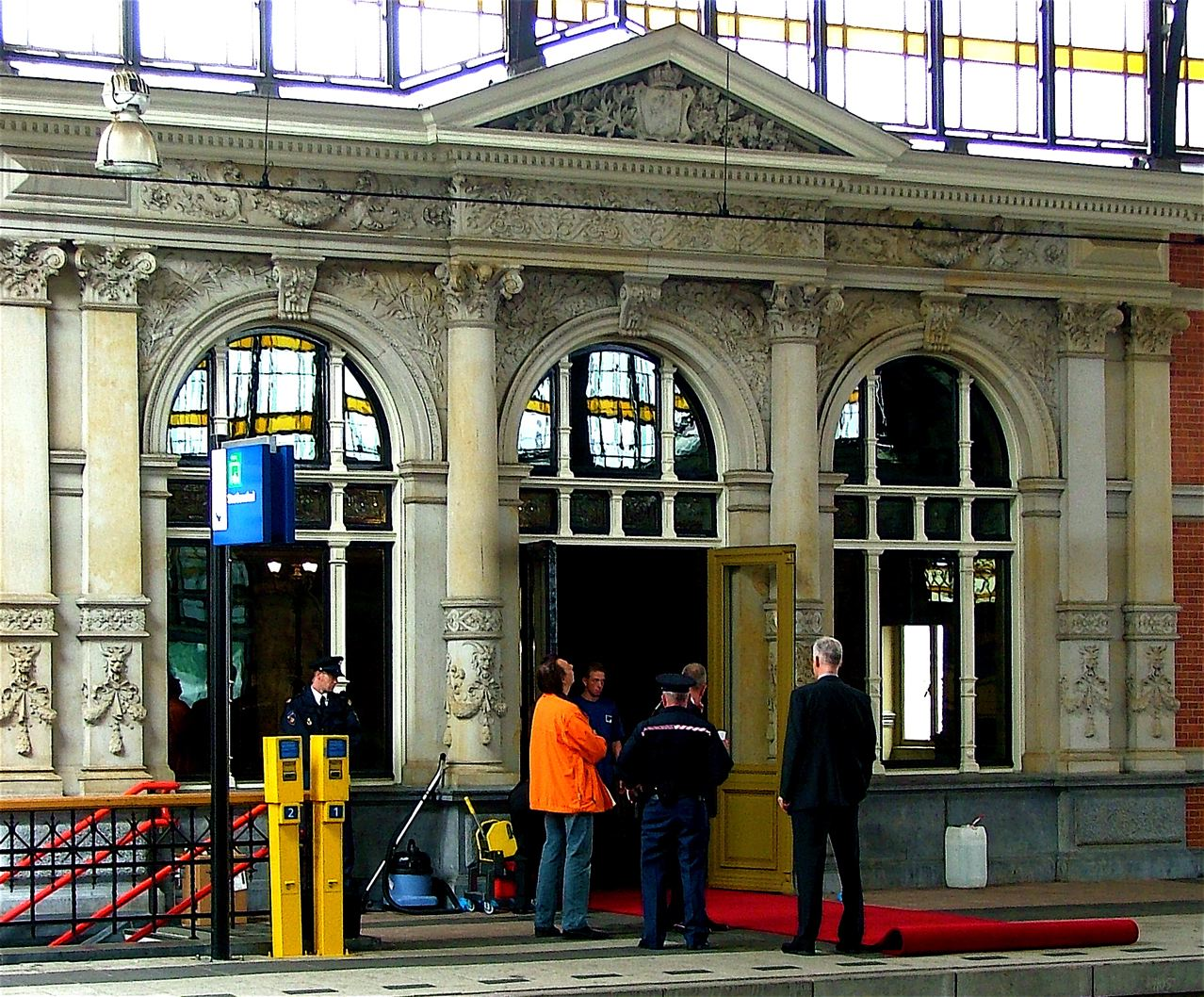
Royal waiting room at the first platform of Den Haag HS

Royal waiting room from Den Haag SS on display in the Railway Museum (Netherlands)

The staircase of the Royal waiting room in the Den Haag HS railway station.

Interior of the royal waiting room at Amsterdam Centraal station

=== Royal usage ===
In principle, the royal waiting rooms are used by members of the royal house and their guests. One of the last times Queen Beatrix used the waiting room at Den Haag HS station (Hollands Spoor) was on 31 October 2004, when she visited Breda with the Polish president to commemorate the sixtieth anniversary of Breda's liberation by the Polish army. On 16 June 2007, Queen Beatrix used this waiting room when she travelled by royal train to Barendrecht station for the opening of the Betuweroute. On 31 March 2011, this room was opened to the public when the Freedom Train was christened in the presence of Prince Willem-Alexander. On 15 February 2013, the same waiting room was used by Prince Willem-Alexander and his family prior to a winter sports trip to Lech in Austria with a royal private railroad car coupled to the Alpenexpress. On 27 April 2017, the waiting room was again used by the now King Willem-Alexander and his family prior to King's Day 2017 in Tilburg, where they travelled by train.

== United Kingdom ==
A number of stations in the United Kingdom are equipped with royal waiting rooms. All rooms are located in or near stations located at royal residences. The following British stations had a royal waiting room:

- Ballater railway station, in Ballater near the holiday home Balmoral Castle
- Windsor & Eton Riverside railway station
- Wolferton railway station
