= Snekkersten railway station =

Railway station in Helsingør, Denmark

Snekkersten
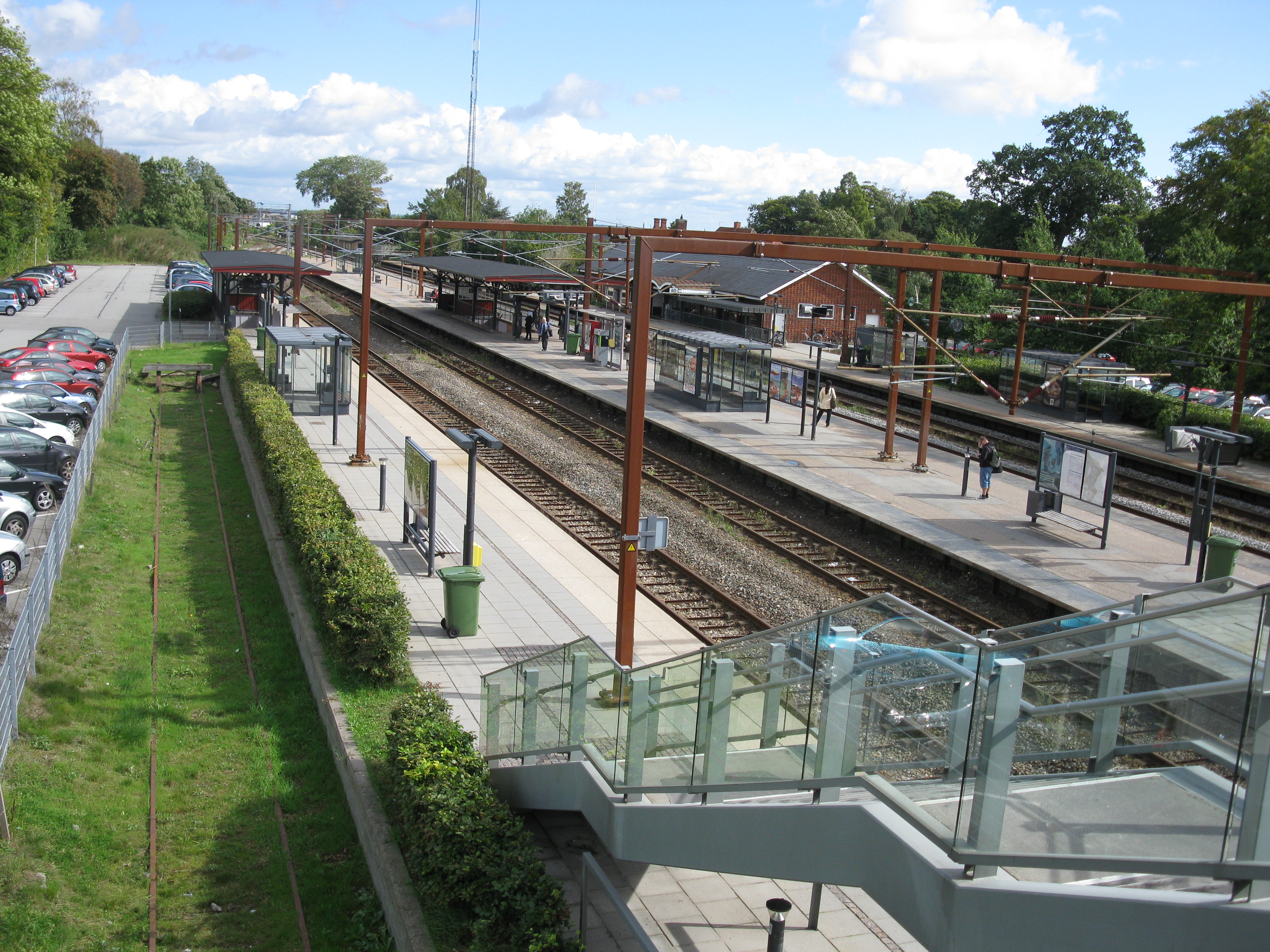
- Snekkersten station in 2010

General information
- Location: 93 Nørrevej; 3070 Snekkersten; Helsingør Municipality
- Coordinates: 56°00′34″N 12°35′01″E
- Elevation: 24.0 metres (78.7 ft)
- Owner: DSB (station infrastructure); Banedanmark (rail infrastructure)
- Lines: Coast Line; Little North Line
- Train operators: DSB; Lokaltog

Other information
- Website: Official website

History
- Opened: 1891
- Rebuilt: 1954

Services
Preceding station	DSB	Following station
Helsingør Terminus	Elsinore–Copenhagen– Roskilde–Holbæk Regional train	Espergærde towards Holbæk
Helsingør Terminus	Elsinore–Copenhagen– Roskilde–Næstved Regional train	Espergærde towards Næstved
Preceding station	Lokaltog	Following station
Helsingør Terminus	Little North Line Local train	Mørdrup towards Hillerød
Location

Snekkersten station is a railway station serving the district of Snekkersten in the southern outskirts of the city of Helsingør, Denmark.

It is located on the Coast Line between Helsingør and Copenhagen and the Little North Line between Helsingør and Hillerød. The train services on the Coast Line are currently operated by Danish State Railways, whereas the railway company Lokaltog runs frequent local train services between Helsingør station and Hillerød station.

== History ==
Snekkersten station is not one of the original stations on the North Line which opened in 1864. The tracks were then located a little further to the west. In 1879, a halt was made near Borupgaard, a local farm. Traffic grew significantly when the Coast Line opened in 1897. The station was refurbished by Sigurd Christensen in 1954.

== See also ==
- List of railway stations in Denmark
- Rail transport in Denmark
- History of rail transport in Denmark
