= Mørdrup =

Neighbourhood of Helsingør, Denmark

Coordinates: 56.0000°N 12.5358°E

Mørdrup is a former village and current neighbourhood in the Espergærde district of southern Helsingør, Denmark. Mørdrup has a halt on the Little North railway between Hillerød and Helsingør by way of Fredensborg.

== History ==
Mørdrup is first mentioned in 1466 as Myrdrup and in 1497 as Myrthorp. The name means the "place by a bog established by people from another village". In 1631, the village consisted of nine farms and four houses without land. Its land was divided into three sections: Bybjerg Vang, Mellemvang and Strandvang. The nine farms were Ærtebjerggaard, Bybjerggaard, Højagergaard (later Søbækgaard), Kjærsgaard, Toftegaard, Rolighed, Grødemosegaard and Lerbjerggaard. The village later grew with four smallholdings as well as new houses. In 1791, Rolighed, Grødemosegaard and Lerbjerggaard moved out of the village and closer to their fields. Busserupgaard, and Søbæk Mølle (Søbækhuset) became part of Mørdrup's owners' guild in the 1800s.

The village was originally crown land and, unlike many other villages, has never belonged to Esrom Abbey. From 1672, it belonged to Krogerup Manor at Humlebæk. The new royal road ran between Helsingør and Hørsholm and Hillerød from the beginning of the 18th century. Krogerup Manor ran a school in the village from 1751. It was from 1794 based in the property Godthaab at Hovvej.

All the farms became owned by the farmers in about 1805. The new Copenhagen-Helsingør Railway passed through Mørdrup from its opening in 1964 but the halt in Mørdrup was not established until 1934.

Mørdrup had a windmill located on the eastern outskirts of the village. A smaller windmill, Bybjerg Windmill, stood next to Bybjerggaard. Several cooperative initiatives were taken in the late 18th and early 20th century. A community centre (forsamlingshus) opened in 1893 and a cooperative waterworks in 1929. A private school, Mørdrup Friskole, was also established. Mørdrup was also affected by the rapid growth of neighboring Espergærde.

== Today ==
Remains of the original village can still be seen around the old village pond.
