= Kvistgård railway station =

Railway station in North Zealand, Denmark

Kvistgård
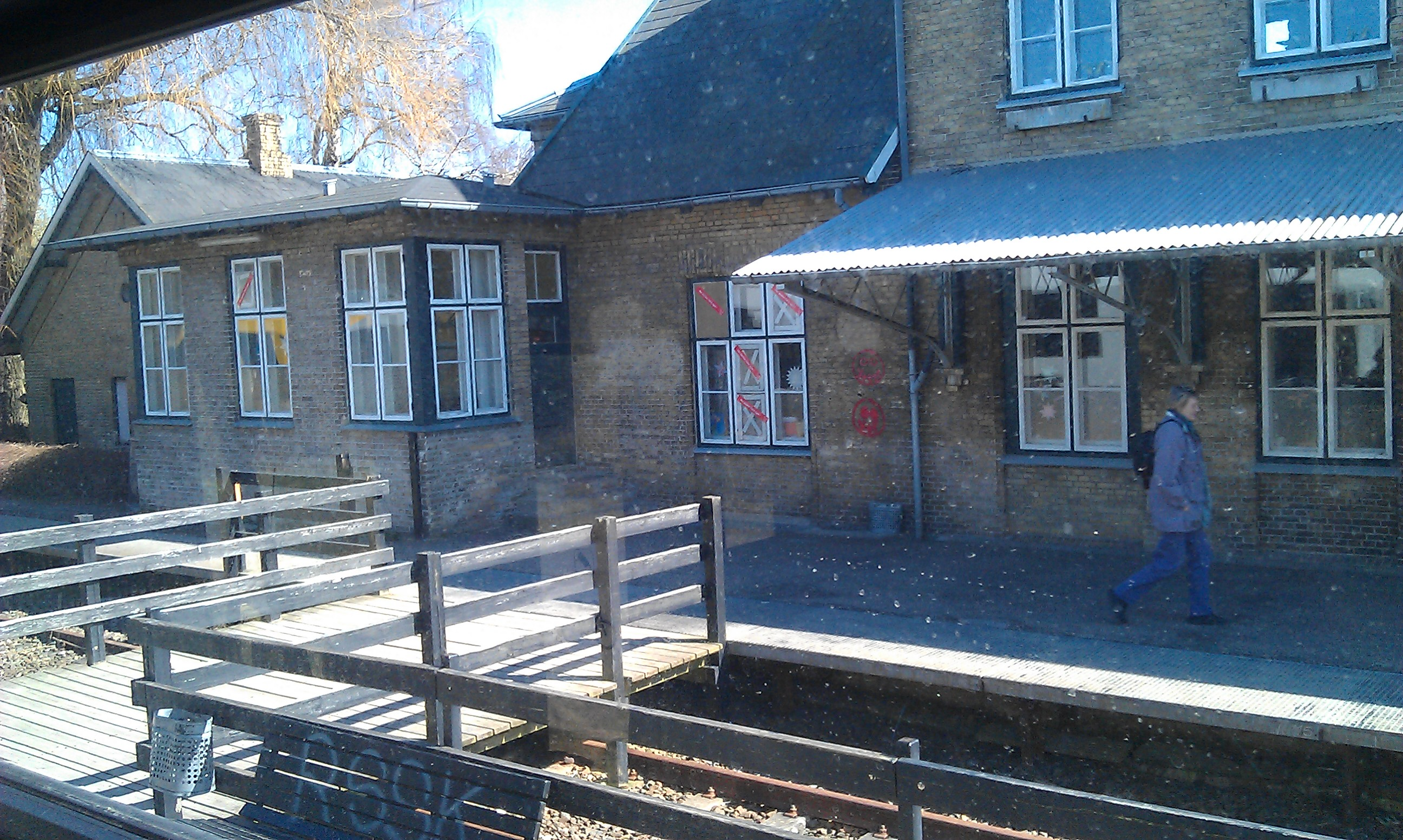
- Kvistgård station in 2012

General information
- Location: Kvistgård Stationsvej 12; 3490 Kvistgård; Helsingør Municipality; Denmark
- Coordinates: 55°59′26″N 12°30′10.3″E
- Elevation: 42.7 metres (140 ft)
- Line: Little North Line
- Platforms: 1
- Tracks: 1
- Train operators: Lokaltog

Construction
- Architect: Vilhelm Carl Heinrich Wolf (1864)

Other information
- Station code: Kå

History
- Opened: 8 July 1864
- Former names: Quistgaard

Services
Preceding station	Lokaltog	Following station
Mørdrup towards Helsingør	Little North Line Local train	Langerød towards Hillerød
Location

Kvistgård station (previous spellings Quistgaard and Kvistgaard) is a railway station serving the town of Kvistgård in North Zealand, Denmark.

The station is located on the Little North Line from Helsingør to Hillerød. It opened in 1864. The train services are currently operated by the railway company Lokaltog which runs frequent local train services between Helsingør station and Hillerød station.

== History ==
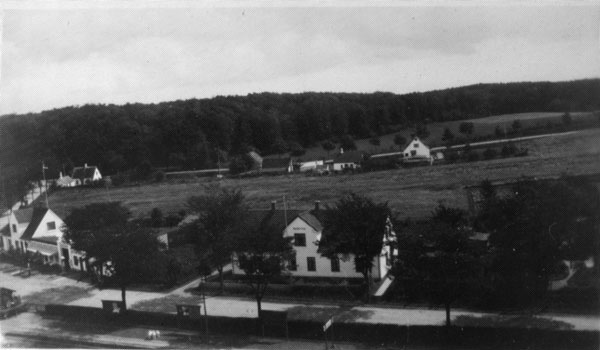
The area east of Kvistgård railway station in 1928: Still open countryside

The station opened on 8 July 1864 as the privately owned Det Sjællandske Jernbaneselskab (English: the Zealand Railway Company) opened the section from Lyngby to Helsingør of the new North Line which connected Copenhagen with Helsingør via Hillerød. The station opened in what was then open countryside and was named after the farm Kvistgård (then spelt Qvistgaard) on whose land it was built.

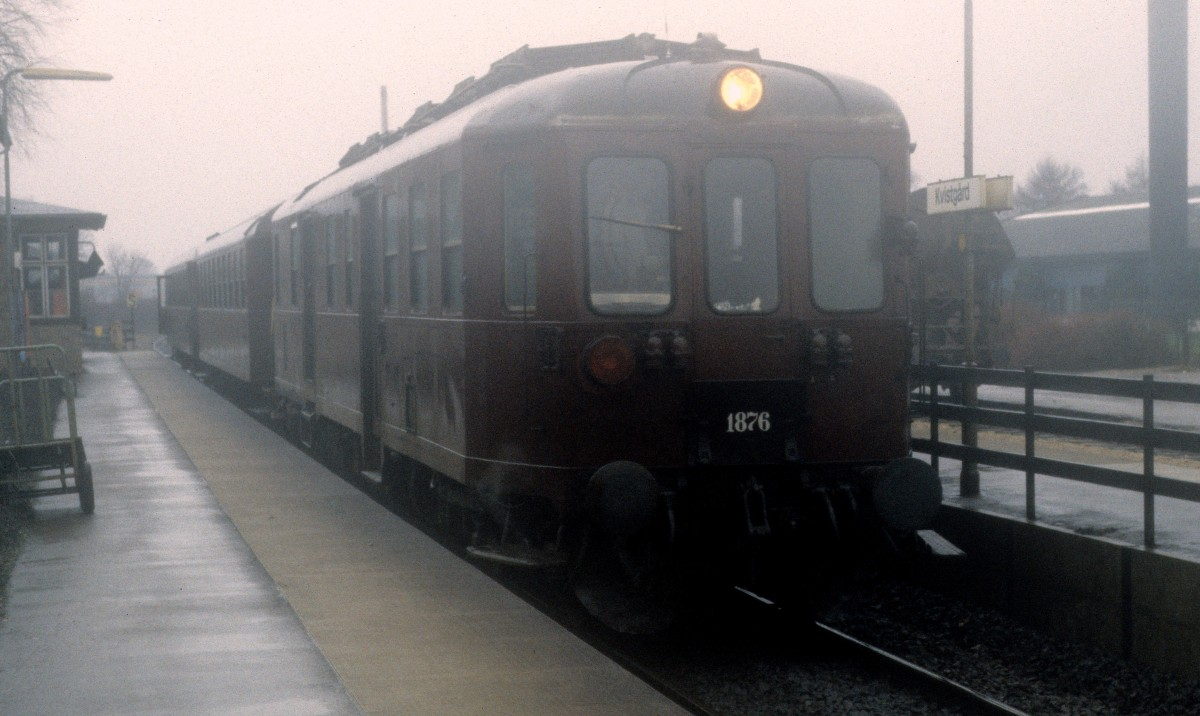
DSB train calling at Kvistgård station in 1983.

On 1 January 1880, the railway station was taken over by the Danish state along with the Zealand Railway Company. And on 1 October 1885, it became part of the new national railway company, the Danish State Railways.

In 2006, operation of the local train services on the Little North Line between Hillerød and Helsingør were transferred from DSB to the regional railway company Lokalbanen A/S. On 1 July 2015 Lokalbanen A/S merged with another railway company Regionstog A/S to form Lokaltog A/S.

== Architecture ==
Like the other station buildings on the North and Klampenborg Lines, Kvistgård station's still existing station building from 1864 was built to designs by the Danish architect Vilhelm Carl Heinrich Wolf (1833–1893).

== Operations ==
Since 2015, the train services from the station are operated by the regional railway company Lokaltog A/S which operates in the Capital Region and Region Zealand.

Lokaltog runs frequent local train services from Kvistgård station to Hillerød and Helsingør with onward connections from there to the rest of Denmark.

== Cultural references ==
Kvistgård station is used as a location (called Bredsted Station) in the 1942 Danish psychological drama film Natekspressen (P. 903).

== See also ==
- List of railway stations in Denmark
- Rail transport in Denmark
- History of rail transport in Denmark
- Transportation in Denmark
- Lokaltog
