= Fredensborg railway station =

Railway station in Fredensborg, Denmark

Fredensborg
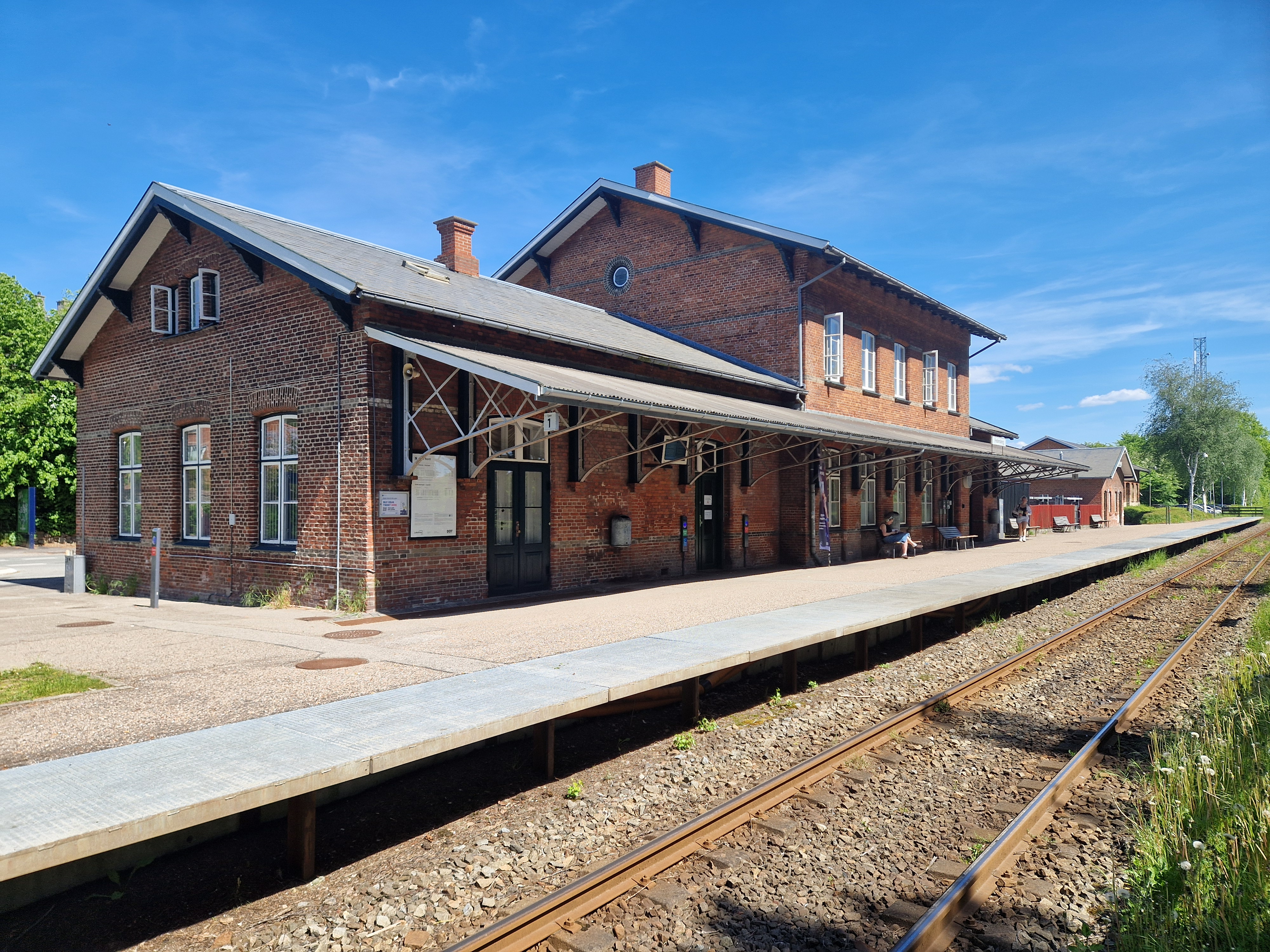
- Fredensborg Station in 2024

General information
- Location: Stationsvej 2; 3480 Fredensborg; Fredensborg Municipality; Denmark
- Coordinates: 55°58′38″N 12°24′25″E
- Elevation: 31.0 metres (101.7 ft)
- Owner: Hovedstadens Lokalbaner
- Operator: Lokaltog
- Line: Little North Line
- Platforms: 2
- Tracks: 2

Construction
- Architect: Vilhelm Carl Heinrich Wolf (1863)

Other information
- Station code: Fd

History
- Opened: 8 June 1864; 162 years ago

Services
Preceding station	Lokaltog	Following station
Langerød towards Helsingør	Little North Line Local train	Kratbjerg towards Hillerød
Location

Fredensborg station is a railway station serving the town of Fredensborg in North Zealand, Denmark. The station is located in the centre of the town, about 1 km (0.62 mi) southwest of Fredensborg Palace, the spring and autumn residence of the Danish royal family.

The station is located on the Little North Line from Helsingør to Hillerød. The train services are currently operated by the railway company Lokaltog, which runs frequent local train services between Helsingør station and Hillerød station.

The station opened in 1864. Its station building was built in 1864 to designs by the Danish architect Vilhelm Carl Heinrich Wolf, and is one of only 3 remaining stations in Denmark (Note: The other two being Copenhagen Central Station and Gråsten railway station.) that still has a royal waiting room.

== History ==
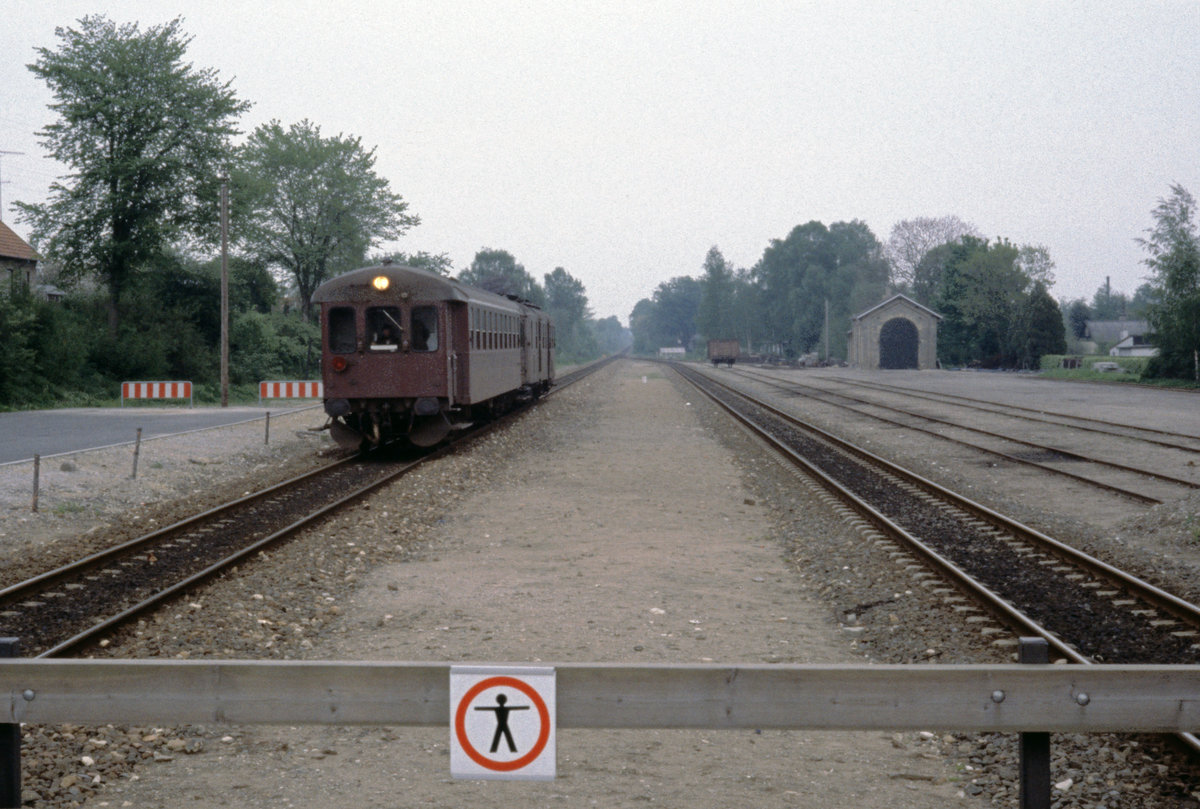
A DSB train from Helsingør to Hillerød arriving to Fredensborg station in 1979.

Fredensborg railway station opened on 8 June 1864 as on one of the original intermediate stations on the North Line which was opened to connect Copenhagen and Helsingør via Hillerød.

== Architecture ==
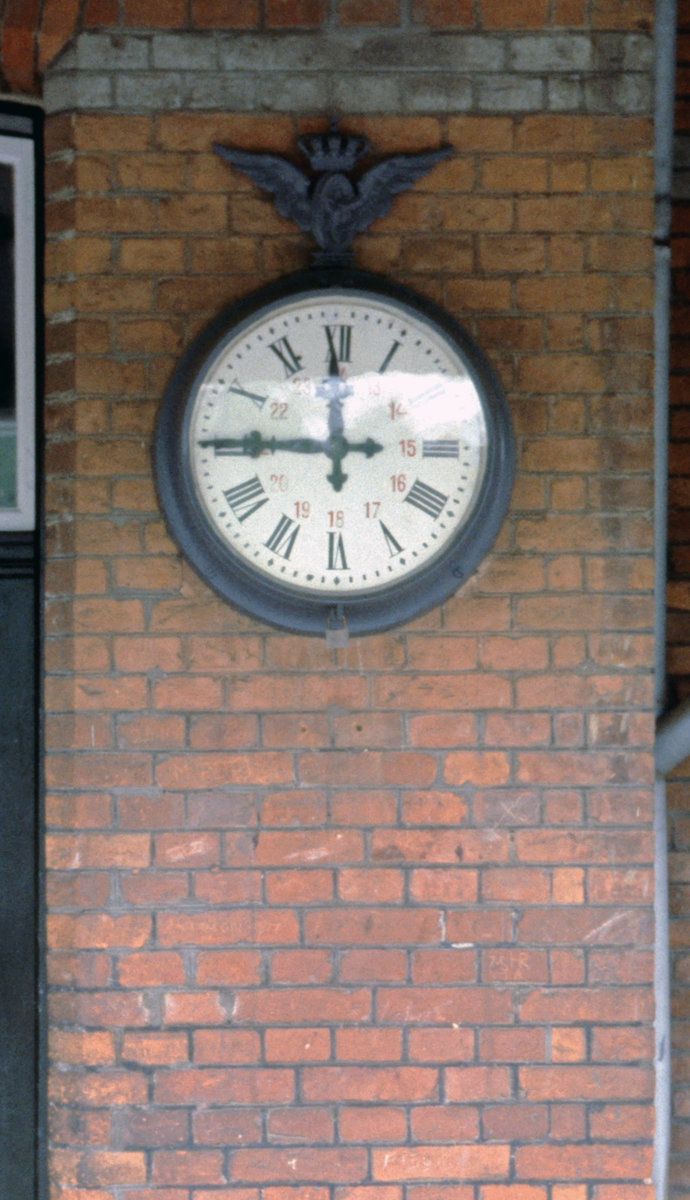
Station clock at Fredensborg station.

Like the other station buildings on the North and Klampenborg Lines, Fredensborg station's original and still existing station building from 1864 was built to designs by the Danish architect Vilhelm Carl Heinrich Wolf (1833–1893).

The station's royal waiting room is located in the western end of the building with its own entrances from the street and the platform.

== Operations ==
The train services at the station are currently operated by the regional railway company Lokaltog which operates a fairly intensive local train service on the Little North Line with light DMUs between Helsingør station and Hillerød station working a fixed 30-minute frequency most in the day time and every hour in the evening.

== Cultural references ==
Fredensborg station is used as a location in the 1964 Danish comedy film Don Olsen kommer til byen.

== See also ==
- List of railway stations in Denmark
- Rail transport in Denmark
- History of rail transport in Denmark
- Transport in Denmark
