= Vedde =

Town in Sorø Municipality, Denmark

Coordinates: 55°31′N 11°32′E

Vedde is a small railway town located in the Sorø Municipality in Region Sjælland on the island of Zealand (Sjælland) in east Denmark. As of 1 January 2026 it has a population of 248.

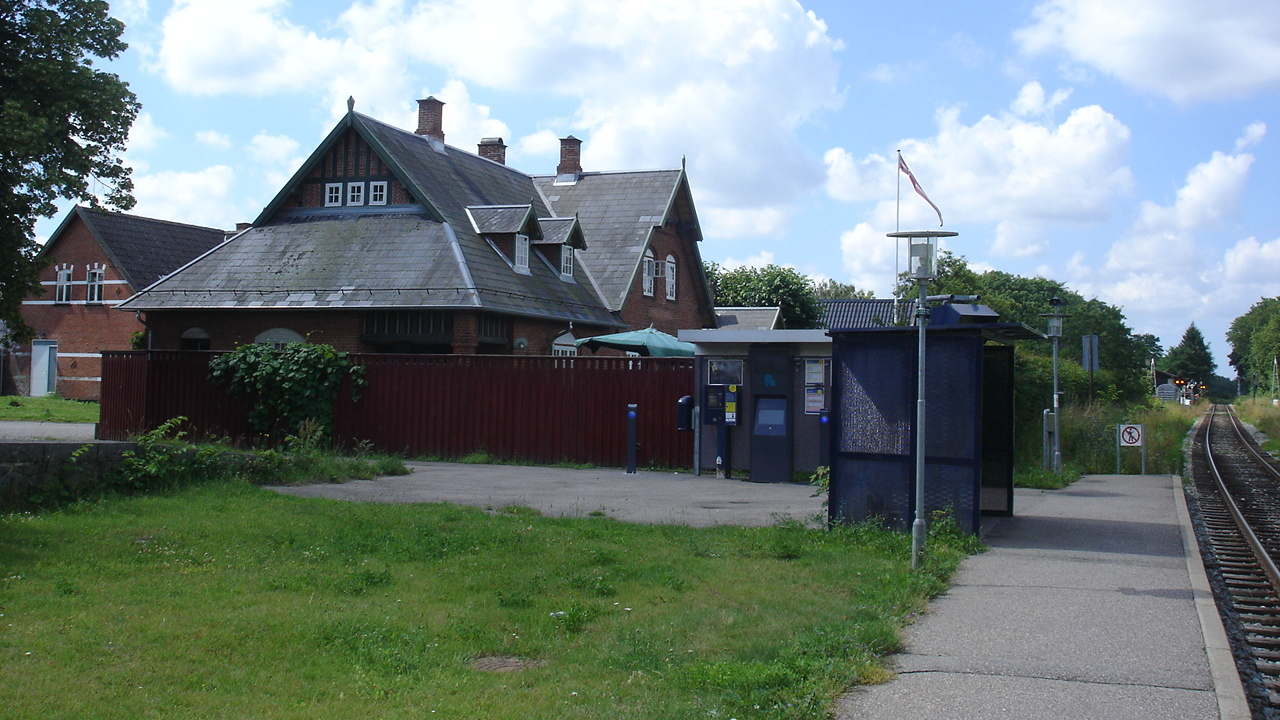
Vedde railway station.

The railway station was built in 1901 as part of the private Høng-Tølløse Railway ((HTJ) Høng-Tølløse Jernbane), but since January 2009 it is operated by the Regionstog A/S. Vedde was a junction between this and the subsequent action Sorø-Vedde Railway (1903–50).
