= Little North Line =

Railway line in North Zealand, Denmark

Coordinates: 55.9748°N 12.4002°E

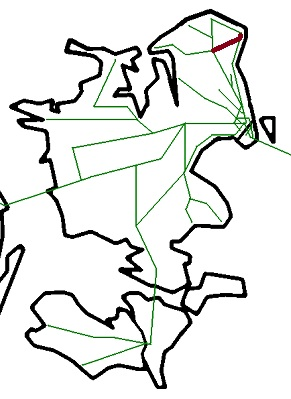
- Location map

Overview
- Native name: Lille Nord
- Status: Active
- Owner: Hovedstadens Lokalbaner
- Termini: Hillerød; Helsingør
- Stations: 9

Service
- Type: Railway
- System: Danish railways
- Operator(s): Lokaltog
- Rolling stock: Alstom Coradia LINT

History
- Opened: 8 July 1864

Technical
- Line length: 20.8 kilometres (12.9 mi)
- Number of tracks: Single
- Character: Passenger
- Track gauge: 1,435 mm (4 ft 8 1/2 in)
- Electrification: No
- Operating speed: 100 km/h

The Little North Line (Danish: Lille Nord) is a local railway line which runs between Hillerød and Helsingør in North Zealand north of Copenhagen, Denmark. The most important town along the route is Fredensborg, home to Fredensborg Palace, one of the Danish Royal Family's two main residences.

The railway line is standard gauge and single track, and the distance from Hillerød to Helsingør is 20.8 kilometres (12.9 mi). The railway opened in 1864 as part of the North Line between Copenhagen and Helsingør by way of Hillerød. The line now constitutes the northernmost section of the original North Line which has not been electrified to form part of Copenhagen's commuter rail network, the S-train.

The railway is owned by Hovedstadens Lokalbaner and operated by the railway company Lokaltog which runs frequent local train services between Hillerød station and Helsingør station.

== History ==
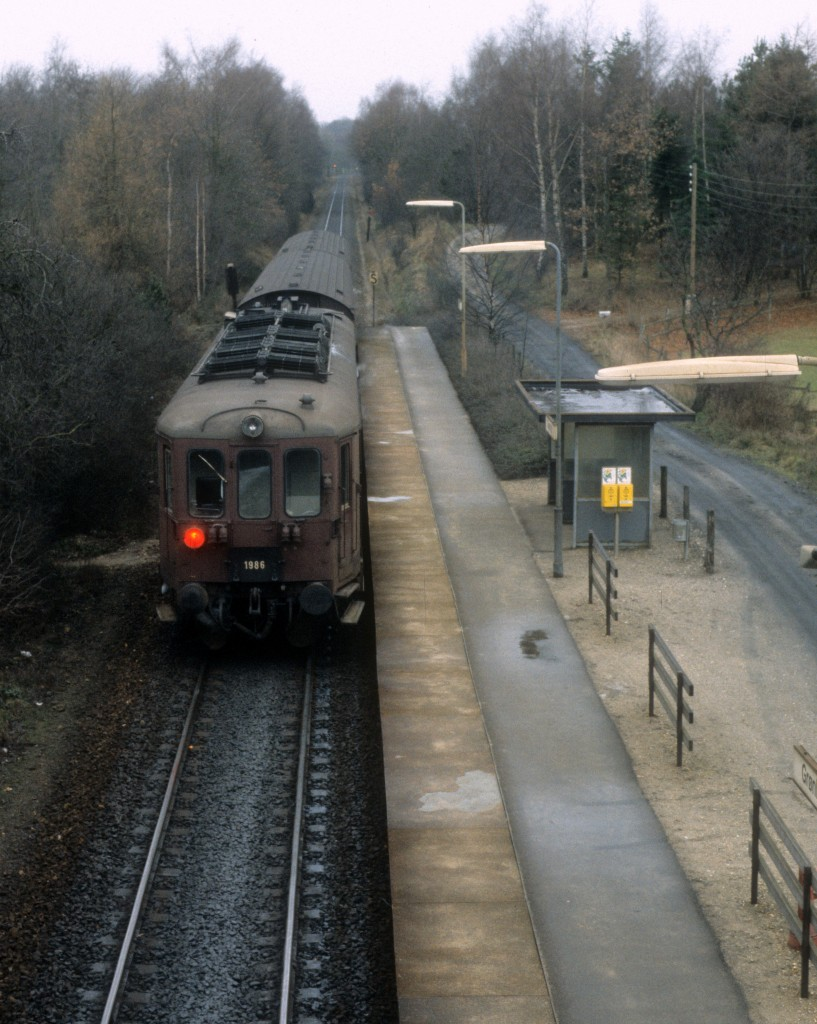
Train on the Little North Line at Grønholt halt in 1983.

The North Line opened in 1864 between Copenhagen and Elsinore by way of Hillerød. It was originally the main line to Elsinore before the more direct Coast Line opened in 1897. The North Line was gradually electrified to form part of Copenhagen's commuter rail network, the S-train, with electrification reaching Hillerød station in 1968. The Little North Line now constitutes the northernmost section of the original North Line which has not been converted into S-train.

== Route ==
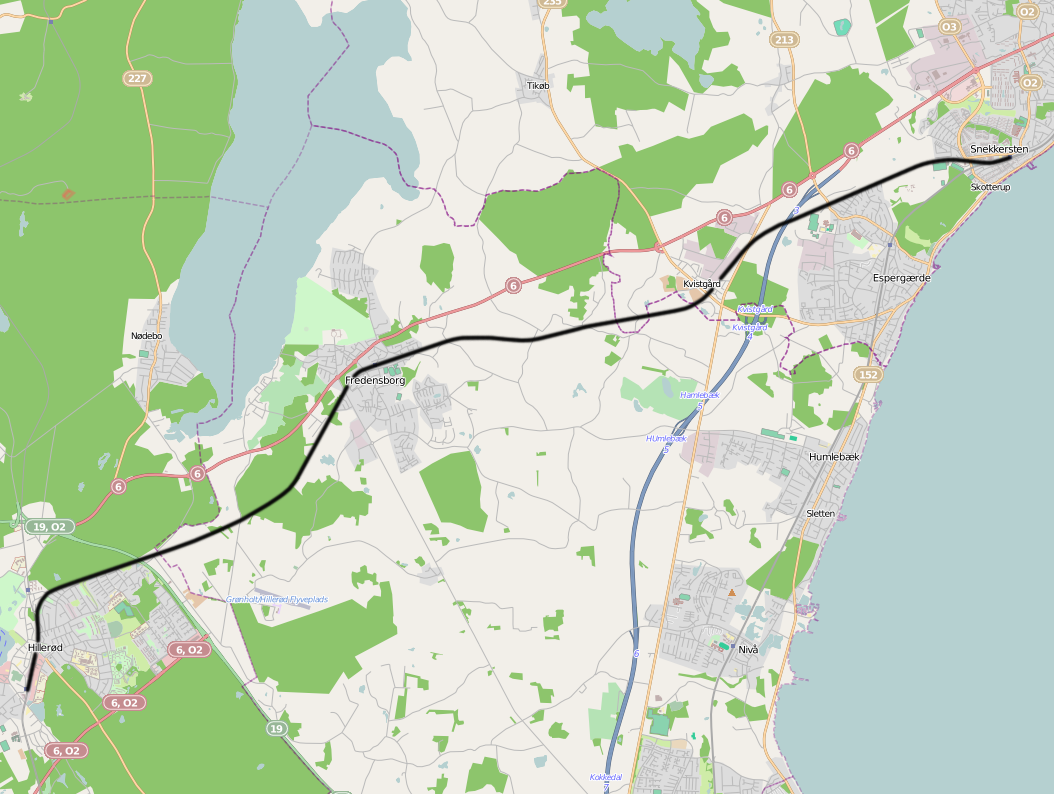
Map of the Little North Line

The line continues the North Line of the S-train network. It runs north from Hillerød station along the tracks of the Gribskov Line, before curving east towards Helsingør. The most important town along the route is Fredensborg, home to Fredensborg Palace, one of the Danish Royal Family's two main residences. The Little North Line joins the Coast Line in Snekkersten, one station before reaching Helsingør.

== Operation ==
Trains on the Little North Line is operated by the railway company Lokaltog. Lokaltog operates a fairly intensive timetable on the Little North Line with light DMUs working a fixed 30-minute frequency most in the day time (until 19:00) and every hour in the evening.

== Stations ==
- Hillerød
- Grønholt
- Kratbjerg
- Fredensborg
- Langerød
- Kvistgård
- Mørdrup
- Snekkersten
- Helsingør

== See also ==
- North Line
- Little South Line
- List of railway lines in Denmark
