= Espergærde =

Danish town

Coordinates: 56°00′N 12°34′E

Espergærde is a town situated in North Zealand near Øresund in Denmark. It is part of the larger urban area Espergærde-Snekkersten-Helsingør (Elsinore), some 5 to 8 km south of the centre of Helsingør, separated from the urban area of Helsingør-Snekkersten by a 100m wide green belt, Egebæksvang forest and an area under natural protection around Flynderupgård (previously a village, later a farm, today a museum). The urban area of Espergærde also covers the two former villages Tibberup and Mørdrup and part of the former fishing village of Skotterup, with 11.524 inhabitants (2008). Espergærde is limited to the north by Egebæksvang forest and Flynderupgård, to the west by Rolighedsmoserne (swamp area) and Helsingørmotorvejen (motorway or highway), to the south by Krogerup mansion fields and Babyloneskoven (Babylone forest). Espergærde is part of Region Hovedstaden (the Copenhagen capital area).

Espergærde has its own postal number, 3060, and is split in two parishes: Egebæksvang Parish (church near the old fishermen's village) and Mørdrup Parish (church next to the urban centre).

== History ==
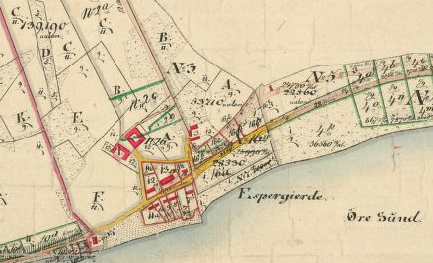
Espergærde in about 1860

The name is first documented in 1555 as Esperegierde. The first part of the name refers to an older village, Asperød, meaning "clearing in an aspen forest"=. - g(k)ærde meaning "fenced", related to English: to gird, girdle, from an PIE word meaning to grasp or enclose.

The original village consisted only of two or three farms located at the top of the coastal cliff. In about 1500, a fishing village with 6-8 houses developed on the beach. A road along the coast connected it to Skotterup and Snekkersten to the north and Humlebæk, Sletten to the south. From Espergærde a road travelled inland to the village of Mørdrup situated about 2 km from the coast.

According to the land tax registration of 1682, 4 fishermen had reserved parts of the coastal area for fishing eel in Øresund, for which they had to pay 2 Danish rigsdaler in land taxes per year; 2 areas were uninhabited and 6 houses lacking additional land had to pay 1 rigsdaler in land taxes p.a.

In feudal times, Espergærde, together with the villages Mørdrup and Tibberup, belonged to the mansion Krogerup situated to the south. The farmers in these villages had an obligation of corvée (unpaid, unfree intermittent labour for limited periods of time) towards the mansion, and the road from Mørdrup to the south towards Tibberup (and from here further on to Krogerup) still has the name "Hovvej", referring to these conditions, derived from the Danish term "hoveri". Krogerup mansion was one of few private estates in North Zealand which mainly belonged to the crown. Along the coast line, and in front of the slope south of Espergærde harbour, fishermen's houses were built with easy access to the sea. Only a few of those houses are left, with Strandvejen 376 as one of the best preserved A typical fisherman's house from the early 1800.

=== Summer holiday area and railway town ===
Between 1841 and 1847, a celebration recalling the beginning of Provinsialstænderne (Provincial Estates) was held each May 28th. Similar celebrations are held in other towns. Originally, this was a celebration of the Radical Party's candidate, ship broker N.P. Kinck's victory over the Conservative Party's candidate in the Helsingør elections, January 8, 1841 in the Provincial Representatives' Council (Estates) of the Danish Islands. Egebæksvang was elected as the location partly because of requests from rural residents. The first celebration brought together 5–6000 people from the area as well as Helsingør by Hvidestensbakken (White Stone Hill) in the forest, and celebrations continued here subsequently. During Treårskrigen (Three Year War), 1848–1850 in the Dutchies Slesvig-Holstein no celebrations took place and from 1852 the celebrations were renewed, but at this point in time rather honouring the June 5 1849 constitution; A stone monument commemorating the constitution was raised in the forest. The celebrations were held annually until 1855, when the forest was used for parties for different purposes like building a harbour for the fishermen in Snekkersten and Espergærde etc. The different celebrations attracted summer holiday guests to the area, including people from Copenhagen.

A steam boat line was expanded to the north and from 1877 the steam boat made stops in Copenhagen and the villages along the coast: Skovshoved and Bellevue Beach, Tårbæk, Skodsborg, Vedbæk, Rungsted, Humlebæk, Snekkersten, Helsingør as well as Helsingborg in Sweden. The same year a regular post route began operating from Helsingør to Snekkersten, Skotterup and Egebæksro (on the fringes of the forest of Egebæksvang just south of the small Egebækken stream, running into The Øresund). The post coastline stopped after a short time but the summer holiday visitors continued to arrive in greater numbers.

Until the 1870s the visitors came mainly on day trips to the forest and the beach, but according to the Law of Business Enterprise (næringsloven) of 1857, private house owners were allowed to rent out their homes to lodge and board visitors. The locals would rent out their homes and move to storage sheds, stables and other adjacent buildings during the summer. Consequentially, summer cottages started to be built in areas close to the coast, the oldest being "Mary Hill" from 1848, the next "Hostruphus", built as a national gift in 1870 for the poet Christian Hostrup. During the 1870s and 1880s, the coastal area between Egebæksvang and Øresund became one of the most popular places for Copenhagen summer holiday visitors, and by 1880 a large part of the coast was already filled with summer cottages.

== Economic development ==
The increasing number of summer visitors gave way to new enterprises: First, a large number of cottages were built, thus creating jobs for construction workers. In 1850 there were only 3 such construction workers in the Espergærde area, one in each of the villages Skotterup, Mørdrup and Tibberup. In 1870 there were 8 building workers. In 1880 the number had grown to 18, subsequently increasing to 22.

Consequentially, the summer visitors created new possibilities for trade, both for the farmers and fishermen, who were allowed to sell their produce directly, as well as for shop keepers like the store in Skotterup and the stores in Helsingør.

At the end of the 19th century, the number of summer cottages grew quickly and from 1897, when Kystbanen (coastal rail road) was opened (with a local station from 1903), about 1 km from Espergærde, a small town grew up, mainly of summer cottages.

This was followed by shops and a spa hotel, "Gefion" built in 1896 above the coastal slope with a view to the fishermen's village and the sea. More houses and summer cottages were built between the village and the railroad station on the southern side of Egebæksvang forest. Additional craftsmen and traders followed these developments and even led to some light industrial production. However, most of the working people commuted by train to Helsingør or Copenhagen, and for a time the coastal railroad was humorously known as the "gross traders train" (grosserertoget).

== Population Growth ==
The development continued until World War II, when the fishermen's village became a town, first with many summer holiday visitors, later as a residential area for people working in Helsingør or Copenhagen. In 1911 there were 500 people in the town, in 1916 713 people in 144 houses.

In 1947 the first zoning plan was made in the local community with the proposal to build on the entire 2 km2 area from the coast to the inland villages, and during the 1960s this development took place. In 1950, the inhabitants had grown to some 2600 people. From 1960 to 1970 the number of inhabitants grew from 4,000 to 10,000 people. Because of this development Espergærde became the administrative centre of the local community. In 1970 the rural community was merged with Helsingør city, and Espergærde became a centre for the planning department.

In 2009, Espergærde became part of Greater Helsingør Municipality in spite of fierce local opposition. The two urban areas are divided by a 100m (approx.) undeveloped area between Espergærde-Skotterup and Snekkersten-Helsingør.

In October 1943, Espergærde was an important location of the Rescue of the Danish Jews. Most Jews fled from Copenhagen along the northern coast of Sjælland (Zealand) and many ended up in Espergærde, where they found temporary refuge until transport to Sweden could be facilitated.

== Road net and bus connections ==
From Espergærde two main roads run inland and to the northwest. In the north Mørdrupvej (vej = road), passes the villages of Gurre and Nygård and ends in Ålsgårde. To the south Hornbækvej passes the villages of Kvistgård and Tikøb and on to Hornbæk. The town has bus connections via these two roads to the towns of Ålsgårde and Hornbæk, and a third bus connection via Strandvejen to Helsingør.

== Railroad connections ==
Espergærde has railroad connections to Copenhagen and Helsingør via Kystbanen (Coast line), and to Hillerød city and Helsingør via Nordbanen (Northern line) from the railroad station in Mørdrup.

== Trade and service ==
The urban centre is Espergærde centret (centre), Denmark's oldest planned centre, with shops, institutions, medical care, dentist, public library and a Lutheran church. At Øresund coast Espergærde has a harbour, Espergærde Havn, for yachts. It was planned to be built into a marina, a plan that never materialized.

Espergærde is also the location of one of Denmark's biggest high schools, Espergærde Gymnasium & HF, which since the middle of the 1970s replaced Helsingør Latinskole (Elsinore Latin school). The high school hosts an annual international conference, attracting several hundred pupils to the town.

== Recreational areas ==
Both north and south of Espergærde are so-called green wedges. These forested or cultivated areas span out to the coast - or until the Strandvejen (Beach road).

To the north are situated Egebæksvang (forest) and Flynderupgård farm fields towards Snekkersten, to the south farm fields towards Krogerup and the town of Humlebæk. To the west the town is limited by the Rolighedsmoserne (a swamp area) and part of Kelleris Hegn (a forest) situated between Nordbanen (railroad) and Helsingørmotorvejen (Elsinore motorway).

== Notable people ==
- Martin Andersen Nexø (1869–1954), writer, lived in Espergærde.
- Aino Taube (1912 in Espergærde – 1990), Swedish film and theatre actress
- Kim Bodnia (born 1955), a Danish actor, writer, and director, grew up in Espergærde
- Kenneth Willardt (born 1966) a Danish photographer based in New York City, specializing in celebrity, beauty, and fashion portraiture; grew up in Espergaerde.
- Tim Christensen (born 1974), a Danish singer-songwriter and multi-instrumentalist, grew up in Espergærde.
- Christian Nørgaard (born 1994), is a Danish football player in the Premier League, grew up in Espergærde.
