= Fredensborg =

- Town
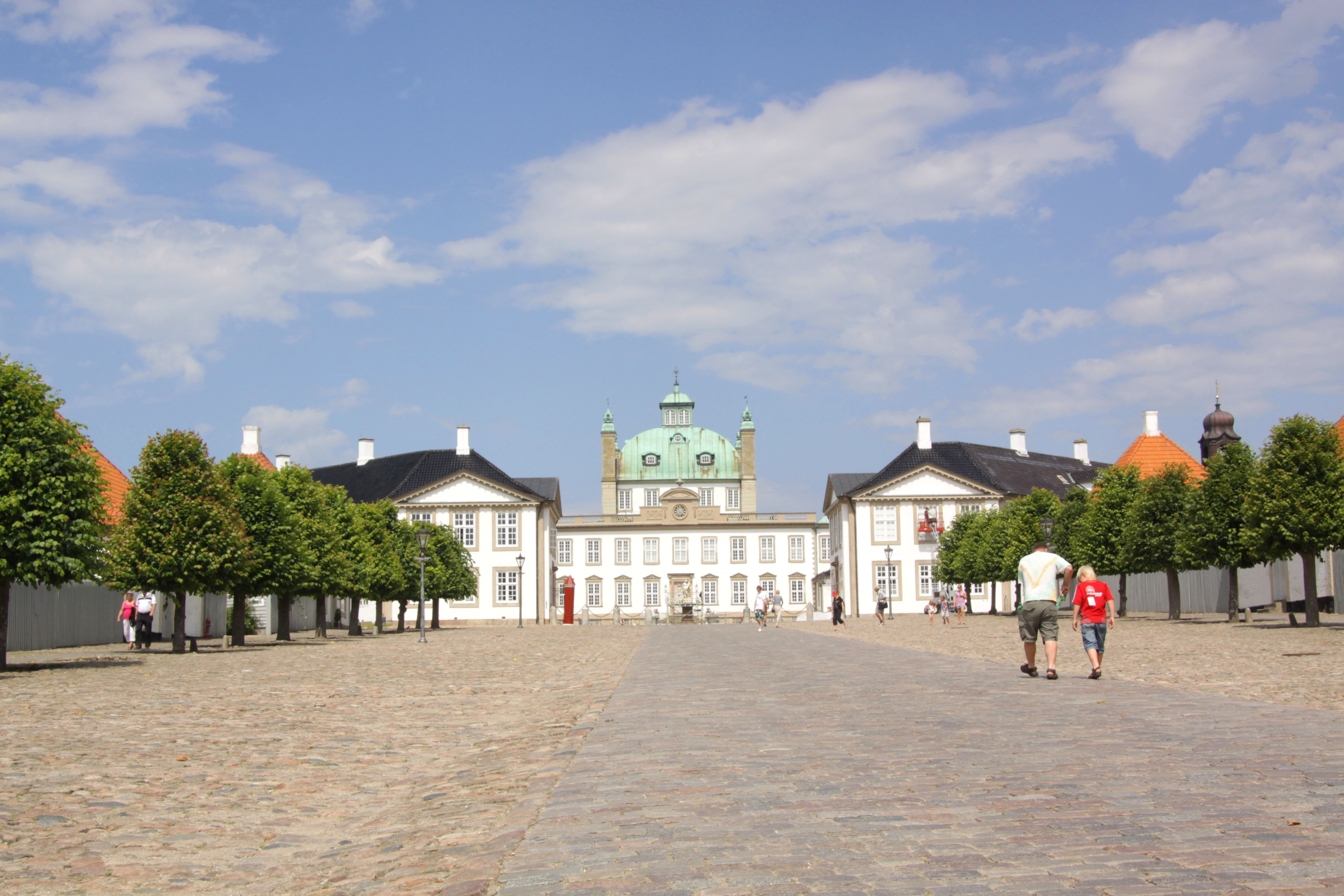
- The plaza in front of Fredensborg Palace

- Location within Denmark Location within Capital Region
- Coordinates: 55°58′30″N 12°24′20″E
- Country: Denmark
- Region: Capital Region
- Municipality: Fredensborg

Area
  - Urban: 4.8 km^{2} (1.9 sq mi)

Population (2026)
  - Urban: 8,941
  - Urban density: 1,900/km^{2} (4,800/sq mi)
  - Gender: 4,207 males and 4,734 females
- Time zone: UTC+1 (CET)
  - Summer (DST): UTC+2 (CEST)
- Postal code: DK-3480 Fredensborg

Fredensborg (Danish pronunciation: [ˈfʁeˀðn̩sˌpɒˀ]) is a railway town located in Fredensborg Municipality, North Zealand, some 30 kilometres north of Copenhagen, Denmark. It is most known for Fredensborg Palace, one of the official residences of the Danish royal family. As of 1 January 2026, the town had a population of 8,941.

== History ==
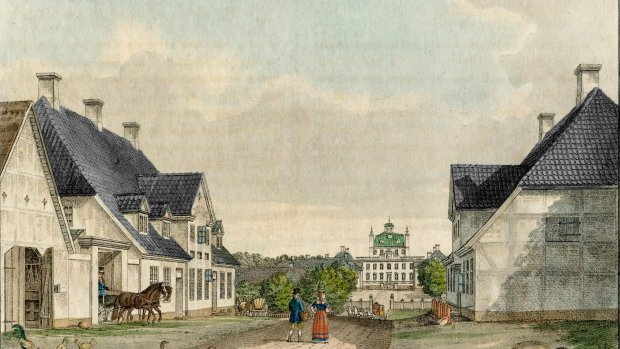
Fredensborg in 1826, drawing by H. G. F. Holm

The earliest settlement in the area was the village of Asminderød. The town of Fredensborg emerged outside Fredensborg Palace, which was designed by Johan Cornelius Krieger and completed in 1722. The name, which means the Palace of Peace," commemorates the termination of the Great Northern War.

Fredensborg Station opened on the new North Line in 1868.

== Fredensborg Palace and surroundings ==
Fredensborg Palace is mainly used by the Danish royal family in spring and autumn. Many of the houses that line the street which leads up to the main entrance to the palace are listed. This is also the location of Store Kro, a historic inn which reopened in 2014.

== Other landmarks ==
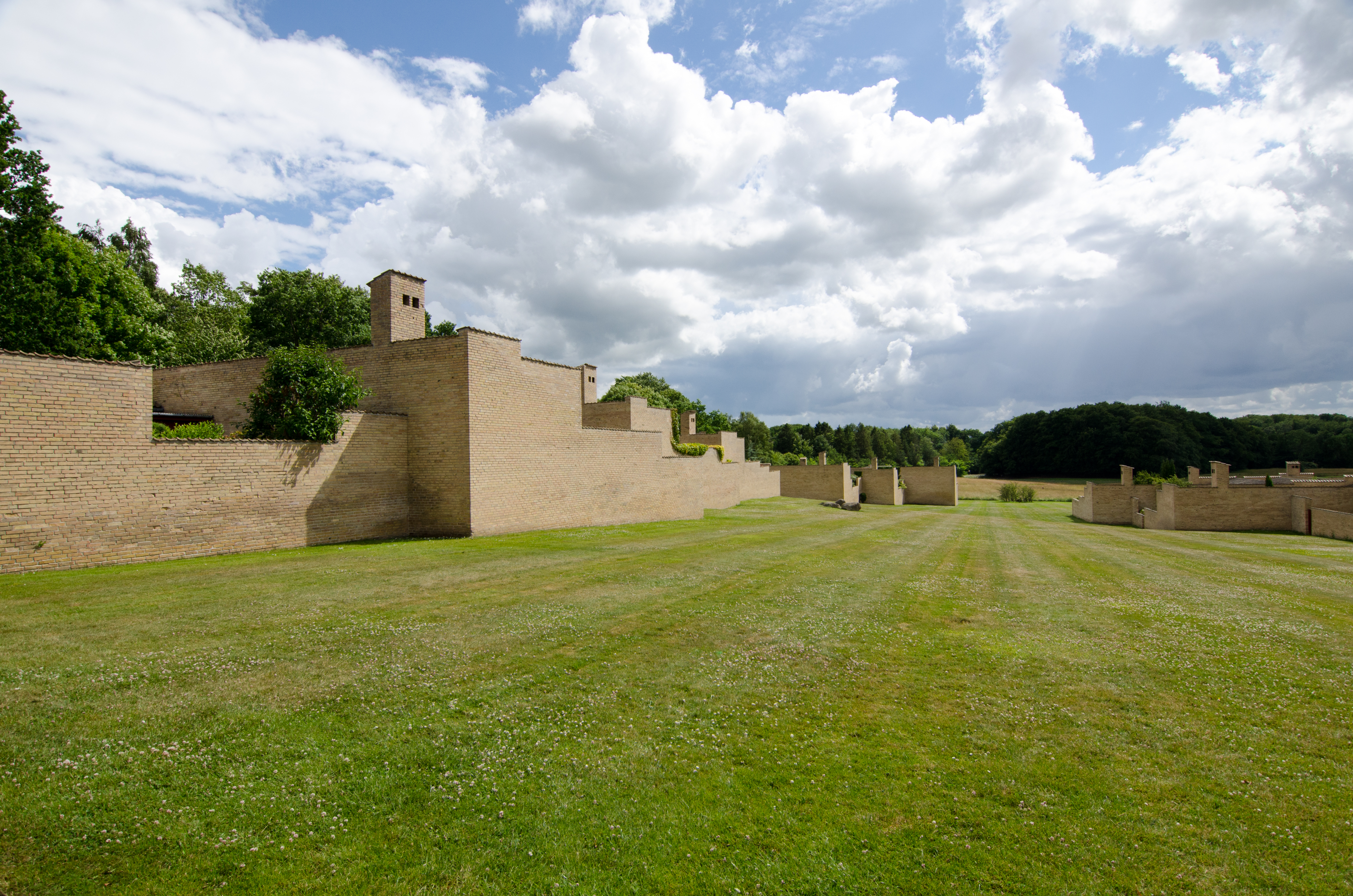
The Fredensborg Houses

Asminderød Church dates from the 12th century. The current tower dates from the 16th century.

The Fredensborg Houses were designed by Jørn Utzon, the architect of Sydney Opera House.

== Education ==
Fredensborg is home to two public primary schools: Fredensborg Skole (with departments on Humlebækvej (Vilhelmsro) and Benediktevej) and Endrupskolen on Endrupvej. Fredensborg Municipality also operates primarys schools in Karlebo (part of Fredensborg Skole), Humlebæk (Humlebæk Skole and Langebjergskolen), Kokkedal (Kokkedal Skole andUllerødskolen) and Nivå (Nivå Skole). The nearest upper secondary schools are Frederiksborg Gymnasium in Hillerød and Espergærde Gymnasium in Espergærde.

== Transport ==
Fredensborg railway station is located on the Little North railway line between Hillerød and Helsingør. The railway company Lokaltog operates the local train service with frequencies of twice an hour in the daytime on weekdays and once an hour in the evening and on weekends.

National route 6, locally known as Hillerødvej (southwest), Lindebakken (central) and Helsingørvej (northeast), connects Fredensborg to Helsingør in the northeast and Hillerød and eventually Roskilde to the southwest. Fredensborg Kongevej links Fredensborg with Hørsholm to the southeast.

== Namesakes ==
- Fredensborg Palace
- Fort Fredensborg
- Fredensborg (slave ship)

== Notable people ==
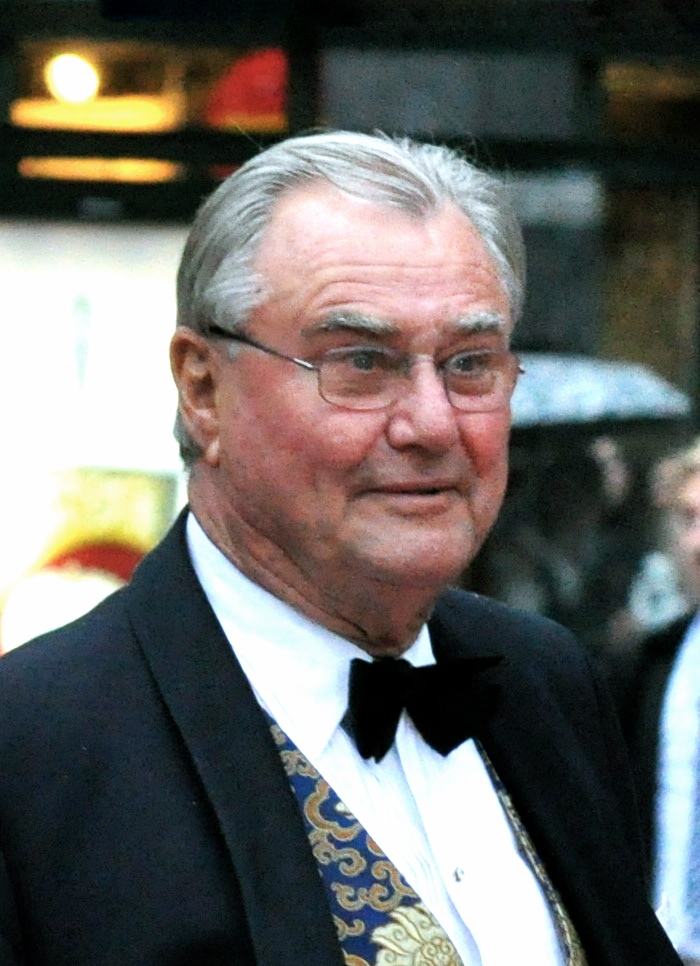
Henrik, Prince Consort of Denmark, 2010

- Carl Wilhelm Jessen (1764–1823), Governor of St Thomas in the Danish West Indies
- Edvard Helsted (1816–1900), composer, died here
- Frederik Hegel (1817–1887), bookseller and publisher
- Caroline Hammer (1832–1915), early professional women photographer, died here
- Carl Ottosen (1918–1972), actor, screenwriter and film director
- Willy Breinholst (1918–2009), author, screenwriter, and humorist
- Henrik, Prince Consort of Denmark (1934–2018), died in the Fredensborg Palace
- Niels-Erik Andreasen (born 1941), Seventh-day Adventist in Michigan
- Nick Hækkerup (born 1968), politician and the Minister of Justice

=== Sport ===
- Lis Hartel (1921–2009) equestrian, Olympic silver medalist, died here
- Morten Nielsen (born 1980), rower
- Majbrit Nielsen (born 1982), rower
- Andreas Bjelland (born 1988) footballer
