= Haslev railway station =

Railway station in Southern Zealand, Denmark

Haslev
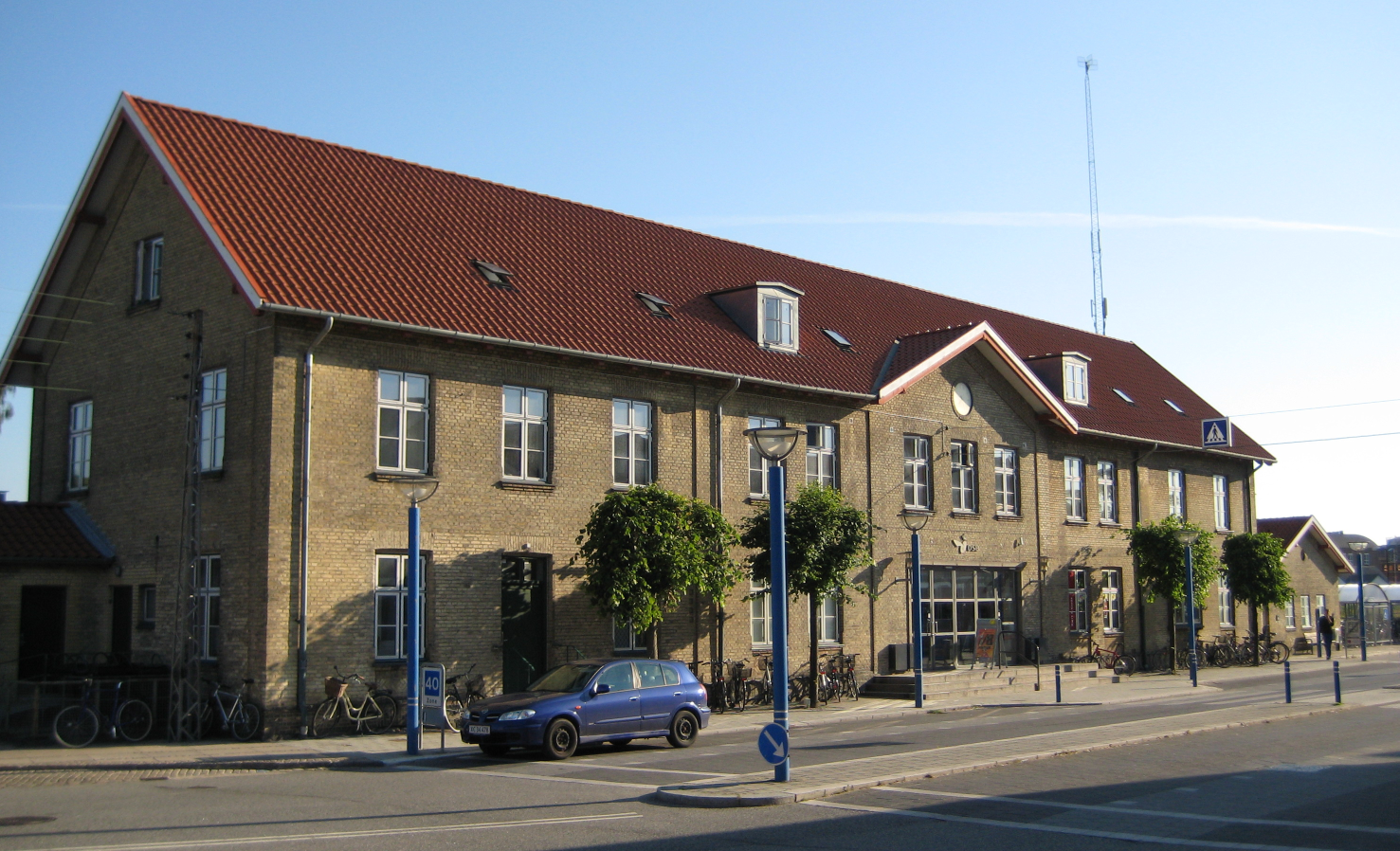
- Haslev station in 2011

General information
- Location: Stationspladsen 1A; 4690 Haslev; Faxe Municipality; Denmark
- Coordinates: 55°19′45.75″N 11°57′39.4″E
- Elevation: 36.2 metres (119 ft)
- Owner: DSB (station infrastructure); Banedanmark (rail infrastructure)
- Line: Little South Line
- Platforms: 2
- Tracks: 2
- Train operators: DSB

Construction
- Architect: Charles Abrahams (1870)

History
- Opened: 4 October 1870
- Rebuilt: 1883-1887, 1910, 1945-1950

Services
| Preceding station | DSB | Following station |
|---|---|---|
| Tureby towards Østerport | Copenhagen–Køge–Næstved Regional train | Holme-Olstrup towards Næstved |
Location

Haslev railway station is a railway station serving the large railway town of Haslev in southern Zealand, Denmark.

Haslev station is located on the Little South branch line from Køge to Næstved. The station opened as part of the original Zealand South Line in 1870. It offers direct regional train services to Næstved, Køge, Copenhagen and Helsingør operated by the national railway company DSB.

== History ==
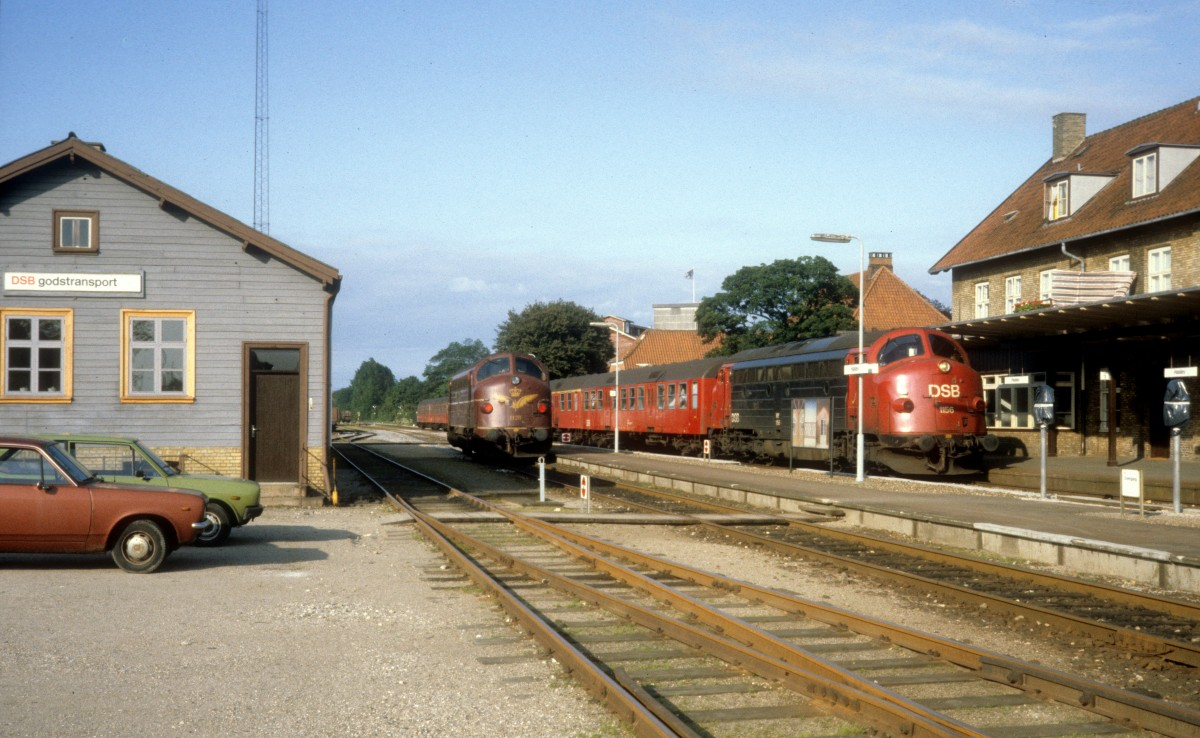
DSB train calling at Haslev station in 1983.

Haslev station opened on 4 October 1870 as the Zealand Railway Company (Danish: Det Sjællandske Jernbaneselskab) opened the original Zealand South Line, which connected Copenhagen with South Zealand via Roskilde, Køge and Næstved. On 1 January 1880, the railway station was taken over by the Danish state along with the Zealand Railway Company. And on 1 October 1885, it became part of the new national railway company, the Danish State Railways.

When the station opened, it was located c. 1 kilometre (0.62 mi) north of Haslev, then a small village with only a few houses and streets surrounding the Haslev Church, which had only 653 inhabitants. A street named Jernbanegade (Railway Street) was paved to connect the church with the newly built railway station. In the years that followed, the street became the main street of an emerging railway town. In the following years, Haslev grew rapidly, and in 1911 the town had 3,668 inhabitants.

In 1924, the section between Næstved and Ringsted of the Central Zealand railway line was opened. Until then, the railway line via Haslev was the main transport route between Copenhagen and the European continent.

== Architecture ==
Haslev station's original station building from 1870 was built to designs by the Danish architect Charles Abrahams (1838–1893). The station building was originally built in the same style as the stations at Tureby and Lundby, but was expanded several times. It was rebuilt completely between 1945 and 1950 when it acquired its present appearance.

== Facilities ==
Inside the station building there is a combined ticket office and café, ticket machines, a waiting room and toilets. The station has a bicycle parking station as well as a car park with approximately 45 parking spaces. Busses run from the station to neighbouring towns, villages and areas.

== See also ==
- List of railway stations in Denmark
- Rail transport in Denmark
- History of rail transport in Denmark
