= Haslev =

- Town
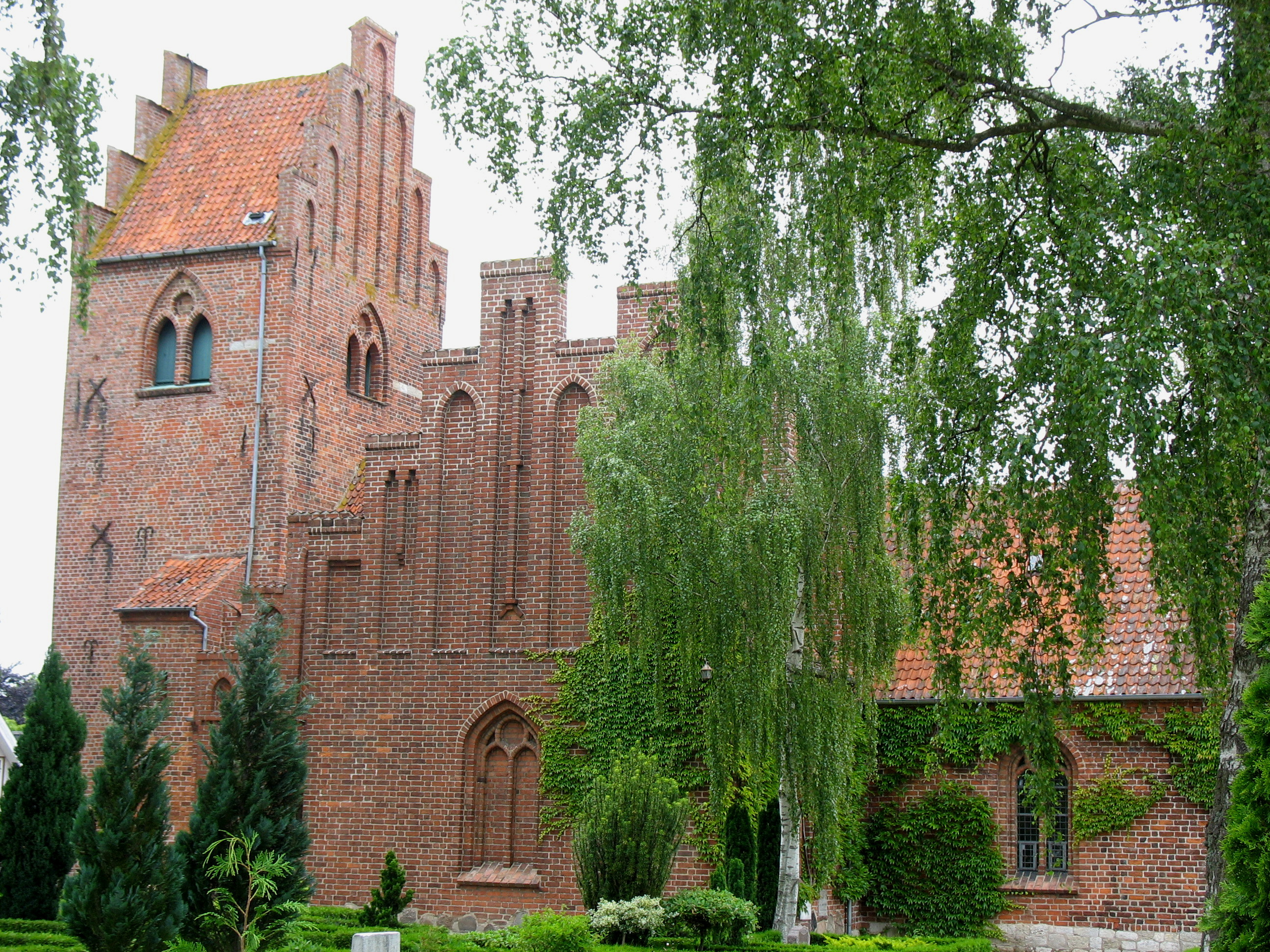
- Haslev Church in Haslev

- Location in Denmark Haslev (Denmark Region Zealand)
- Coordinates: 55°20′N 11°58′E
- Country: Denmark
- Region: Zealand (Sjælland)
- Municipality: Faxe

Area
  - Urban: 7 km^{2} (2.7 sq mi)

Population (2026)
  - Urban: 12,894
  - Urban density: 1,800/km^{2} (4,800/sq mi)
  - Gender: 6,384 males and 6,510 females
- Demonym: Haslevit
- Time zone: UTC+1 (CET)
  - Summer (DST): UTC+2 (CEST)
- Postal code: DK-4690 Haslev

Haslev is a railway town in the southern part of the island of Zealand, Denmark, located about 60 km (37 mi) southwest of Copenhagen. It has a population of 12,894 (1 January 2026), and is the largest town and municipal seat of Faxe Municipality in Region Zealand.

Haslev has six public schools: two boarding schools, a folk high school, a technical school, a college of education, and a sixth-form college.

The estates and castles of Gisselfeld and Bregentved are close to Haslev.

== History ==
Haslev started out being a small village named Hasle with a few houses and streets surrounding the church. It is mentioned for the first time in 1328 as Haslæ and in the Bishop of Roskilde's Urbarium 1370-80 as Hasle and Haslæ. The name was later changed to Haslev to avoid confusion with other similar town names in Denmark.

In 1870, the railway line passing Haslev town was inaugurated. At that time, Haslev had only 653 inhabitants. A street named Jernbanegade (Railway Street) was paved, to connect the church with the newly built train station. In the years that followed, the street became the main street of the town with shops, banks and so forth. In 1911, the town had 3,668 inhabitants. In the 1980s, a square in the middle of the street was constructed.

During the 20th century Haslev grew rapidly, becoming a center for the Church Association for the Inner Mission in Denmark. The latter built a folk high school, sixth-form college (with a boarding school) among others. In the 1970s and 1980s, the schools became independent of the founding association. Today, there are only few remains of the Inner Mission in Haslev.

In the early 1970s and onwards, an entrepreneur named Ole Christiansen founded whole new neighbourhoods of one-family houses with an attached garden at a low expense. This encouraged many families from all over Zealand, and especially Copenhagen, to move to Haslev.

Nobel-Prize winner Jens Christian Skou studied at Haslev Gymnasium (college) in his youth. In 1997, he received the Nobel Prize in Chemistry for his discovery of Na^{+},K^{+}-ATPase

Prior to 1 January 2007, Haslev was a town in Haslev Municipality (kommune). On 1 January 2007 Haslev as the result of Kommunalreformen ("The Municipal Reform" of 2007), became a town in Faxe municipality.

== Transport ==
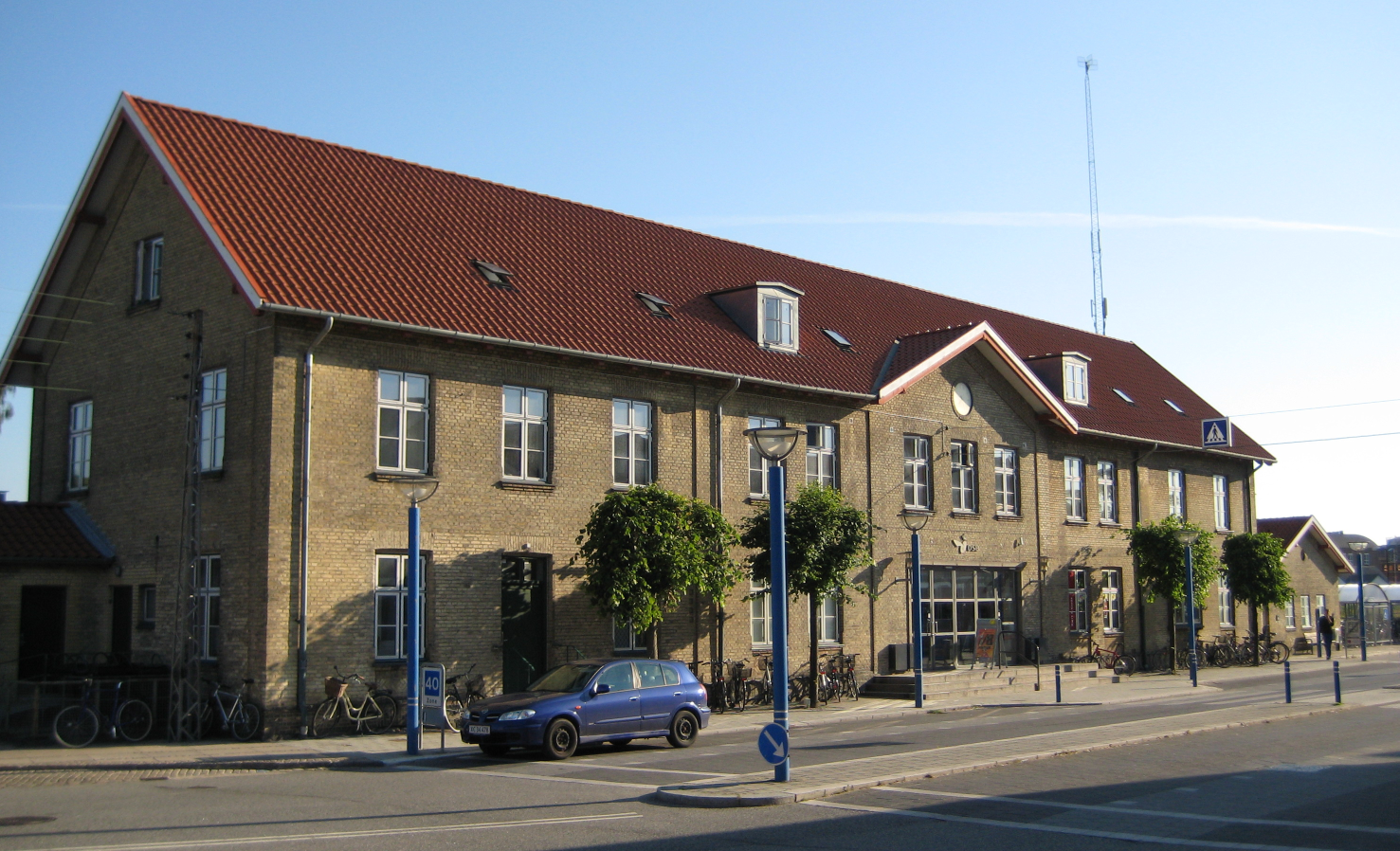
Haslev railway station

Haslev is served by Haslev railway station which is connected to Køge and Næstved and the rest of the Danish rail network by the Little South railway line. Busses run from the station to neighbouring towns, villages and areas.

European road E47 passes a short distance east of Haslev.

== Notable people ==
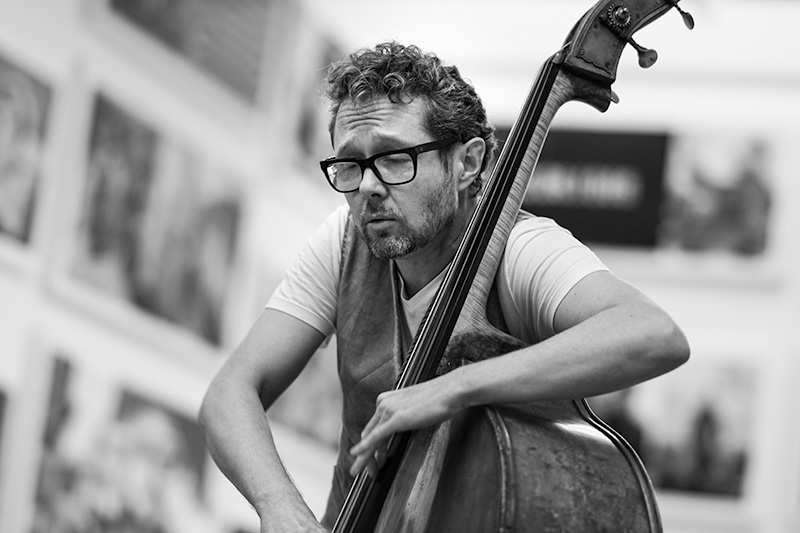
Jesper Bodilsen, 2017

- Carl Emil Moltke (1773 at Bregentved – 1858) a Danish diplomat and landowner
- Emilie Ulrich (1872 in Frerslev – 1952) a Danish soprano who sang leading roles at the Royal Danish Opera from 1894 until 1917
- Marianne Christiansen (born 1963 in Haslev) is a Lutheran Bishop in the Church of Denmark in the Diocese of Haderslev
- Jesper Bodilsen (born 1970 in Haslev) a Danish jazz double bassist
- Anders Egholm (born 1983 in Haslev) a Danish professional football defender, who plays for SønderjyskE
- Jonas Eika (born 1991) a Danish writer.
