= Knud Tanggaard Seest =

Danish architect (1851–1936)

- Born: 16 December 1879; Mølby, near Oksenvad, Denmark
- Died: 18 December 1972 (aged 93); Copenhagen, Denmark
- Occupation: Architect
- Buildings: Aarhus Central Station, Nørrebro Station

Knud Tanggaard Seest (16 December 1879 – 18 December 1972) was a Danish architect, especially known for the numerous railway stations he designed in functionalist style in his capacity of chief architect for the Danish State Railways from 1922 to 1949.

== Biography ==
Seest was born on 16 December 1879 in Mølby, near Oksenvad, then in the Prussian province of Schleswig-Holstein. He attended the Royal Danish Academy of Fine Arts from 1904, graduating in 1909.

From 1906, Seest was employed by the Danish State Railways and worked under chief architect Heinrich Wenck. From 1922 to 1949, he was chief architect for the Danish State Railways. During the years Seest held the post, he designed numerous stations, among these are Ordrup, Ringsted, Padborg, Aarhus Central Station, Horsens, Fredericia, Middelfart, Vordingborg, Nørrebro and Næstved stations which are examples of his functionalist style. In the 1930's, he also built the central station in Tehran.

Seest died aged 93 on 18 December 1972 in Copenhagen.

== Selected works ==
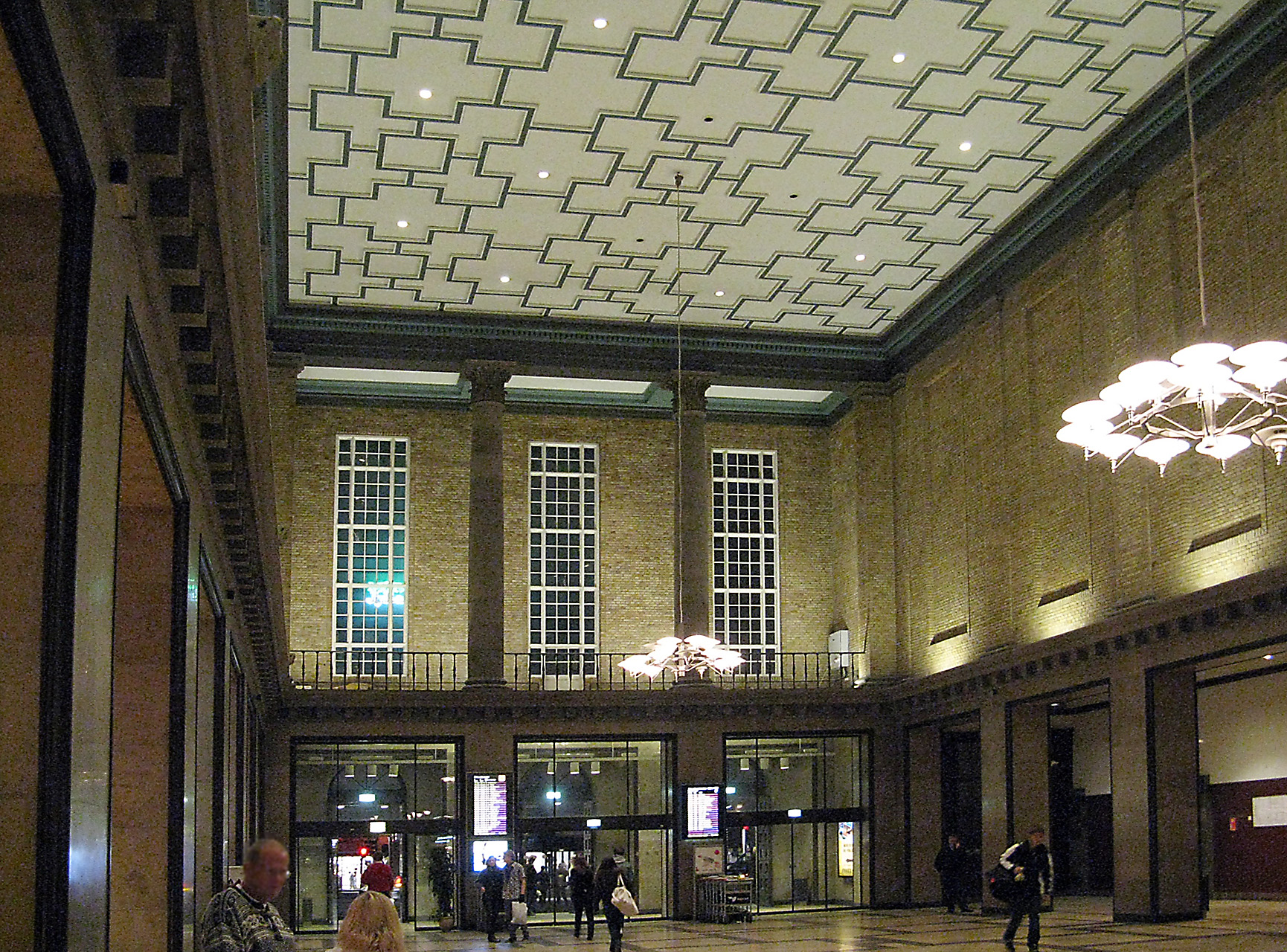
The entrance hall of Aarhus Central Station (1927–29)

- Frederiksberg Kommunale Funktionærers Boligforening, Frederiksberg (1915-16)
- Den Sønderjyske By, Frederiksberg (1921)
- Glumsø railway station, Glumsø (1924)
- Ordrup railway station, Ordrup (1924)
- Ringsted railway station, Ringsted (II) (1925)
- Padborg railway station, Padborg (III) (1928)
- Horsens railway station, Horsens (II) (1929)
- Aarhus Central Station, Aarhus (III) (1927–29)
- Nørrebro railway station, Copenhagen (II) (1930)
- Fredericia railway station, Fredericia (II) (1935)
- Middelfart railway station, Middelfart (II) (1935)
- Bernstorffsvej railway station, Hellerup (1935-36)
- Vordingborg railway station, Vordingborg (II) (1936)
- Peter Bangs Vej railway station, Frederiksberg (1941)
- Hasselager railway station, Hasselager (II) (1945)

== See also ==
- Danish architecture
- List of Danish architects
