= Vordingborg railway station =

Railway station in South Seeland, Denmark

Vordingborg
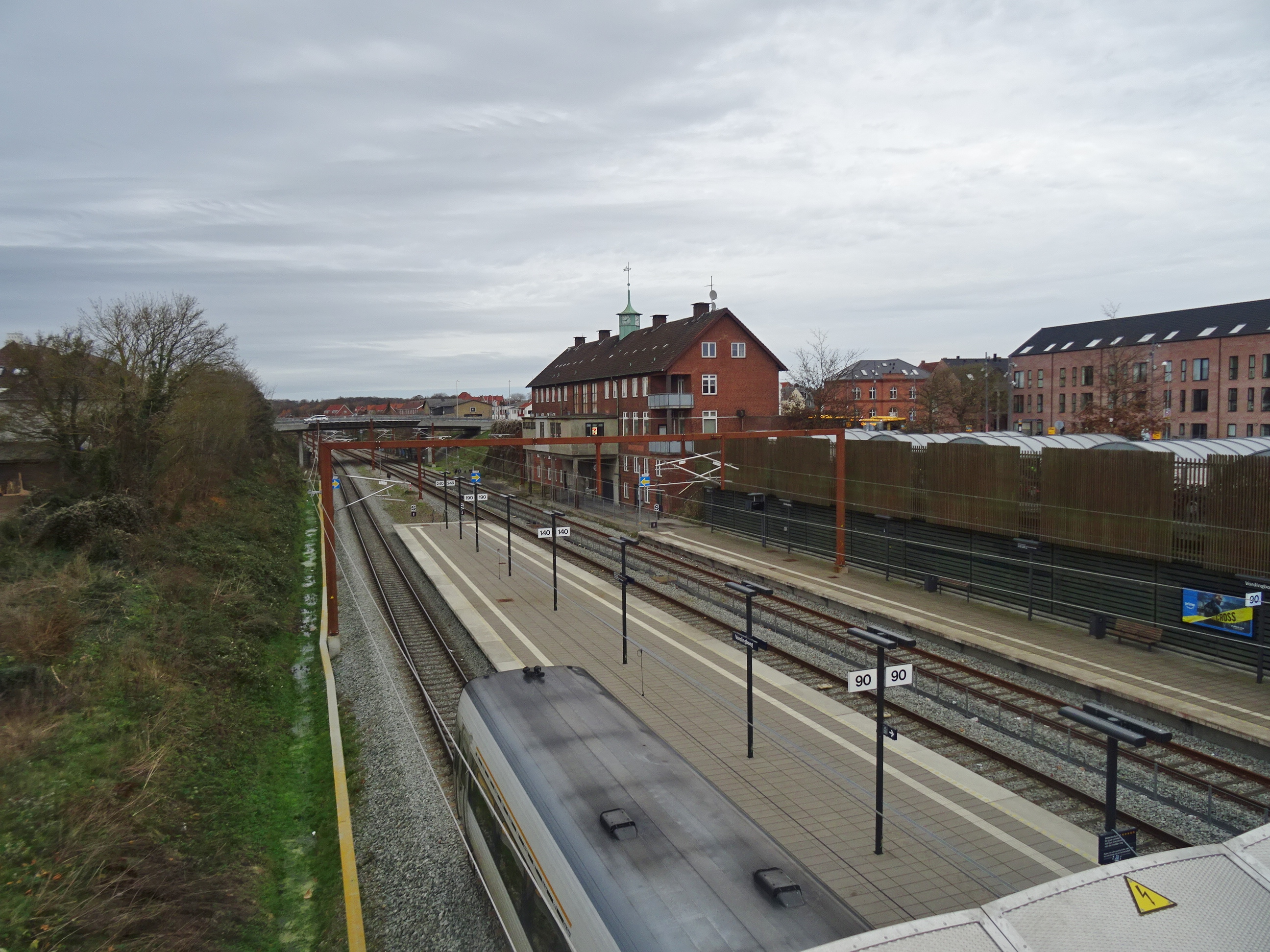
- Vordingborg station in 2024

General information
- Location: Banegårdspladsen 4; 4760 Vordingborg; Vordingborg Municipality; Denmark
- Coordinates: 55°0′45.22″N 11°54′1.06″E
- Elevation: 8.3 metres (27 ft)
- Owner: DSB (station infrastructure); Banedanmark (rail infrastructure)
- Lines: South Line; Kalvehave Line (closed 1959)
- Platforms: 2
- Tracks: 3
- Train operators: DSB

Construction
- Architect: Charles Abrahams (1870); Knud Tanggaard Seest (1937)

Other information
- Website: Official website

History
- Opened: 4 October 1870
- Rebuilt: 26 September 1937

Services
Preceding station	DSB	Following station
Næstved towards Copenhagen Central	Copenhagen–Nykøbing F Regional train	Nykøbing F Terminus
Lundby towards Næstved	Næstved–Nykøbing F Regional train	Nørre Alslev towards Nykøbing F
Location

Vordingborg railway station (Danish: Vordingborg Station or Vordingborg Banegård) is the main railway station serving the town of Vordingborg in southern Zealand, Denmark. It is located in the centre of the town, on the western edge of the historic town centre, and immediately adjacent to the Vordingborg bus station.

Vordingborg station is located on the main line South Line which connects Copenhagen with southern Zealand and the islands of Falster and Lolland. The station opened in 1870, and was moved to its current location in 1937. The current station building from 1937 is designed by the architect Knud Tanggaard Seest.

The station offers direct regional train services to Copenhagen and Nykøbing Falster operated by the national railway company DSB.

== History ==
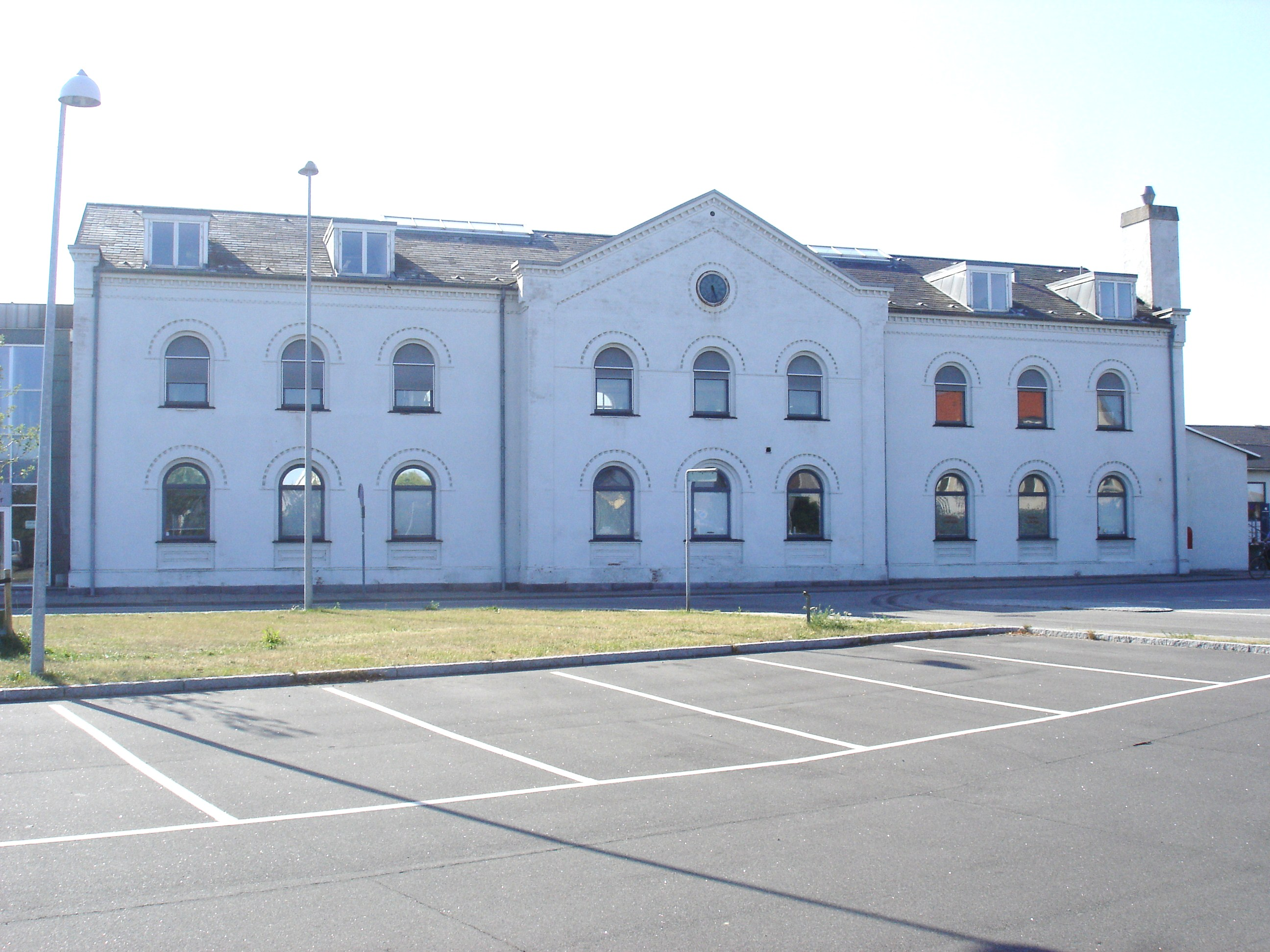
The first Vordingborg station

Vordingborg station opened on 4 October 1870 as the Zealand Railway Company (Danish: Det Sjællandske Jernbaneselskab) opened the original Zealand South Line, which connected Copenhagen with South Zealand via Roskilde, Køge and Næstved. From Masnedsund there was a steamship connection across the Storstrømmen strait to Orehoved on the north coast of the island of Falster. In 1880 the railway line was taken over by the Danish state, and in 1885 became part of the national railway company DSB.

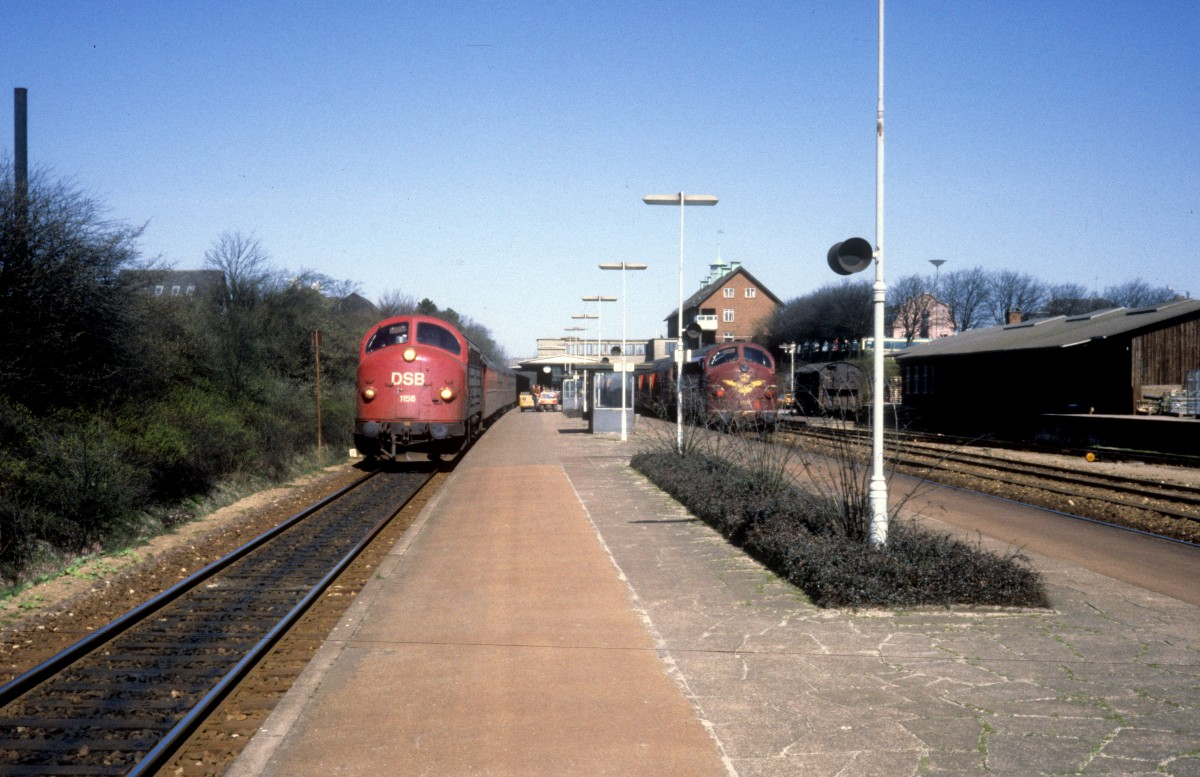
DSB trains at Vordingborg station in 1981.

In 1937, the station moved to its current location together with the opening of the Storstrøm Bridge across the Storstrømmen strait. The new station was inaugurated on 26 September 1937, and the old station was closed. Also from 1937, all trains on the Kalvehave Line between Vordingborg and Kalvehave (opened in 1897) arrived to and departed from Vordingborg station. The Kalvehave Line closed in 1959.

== Architecture ==
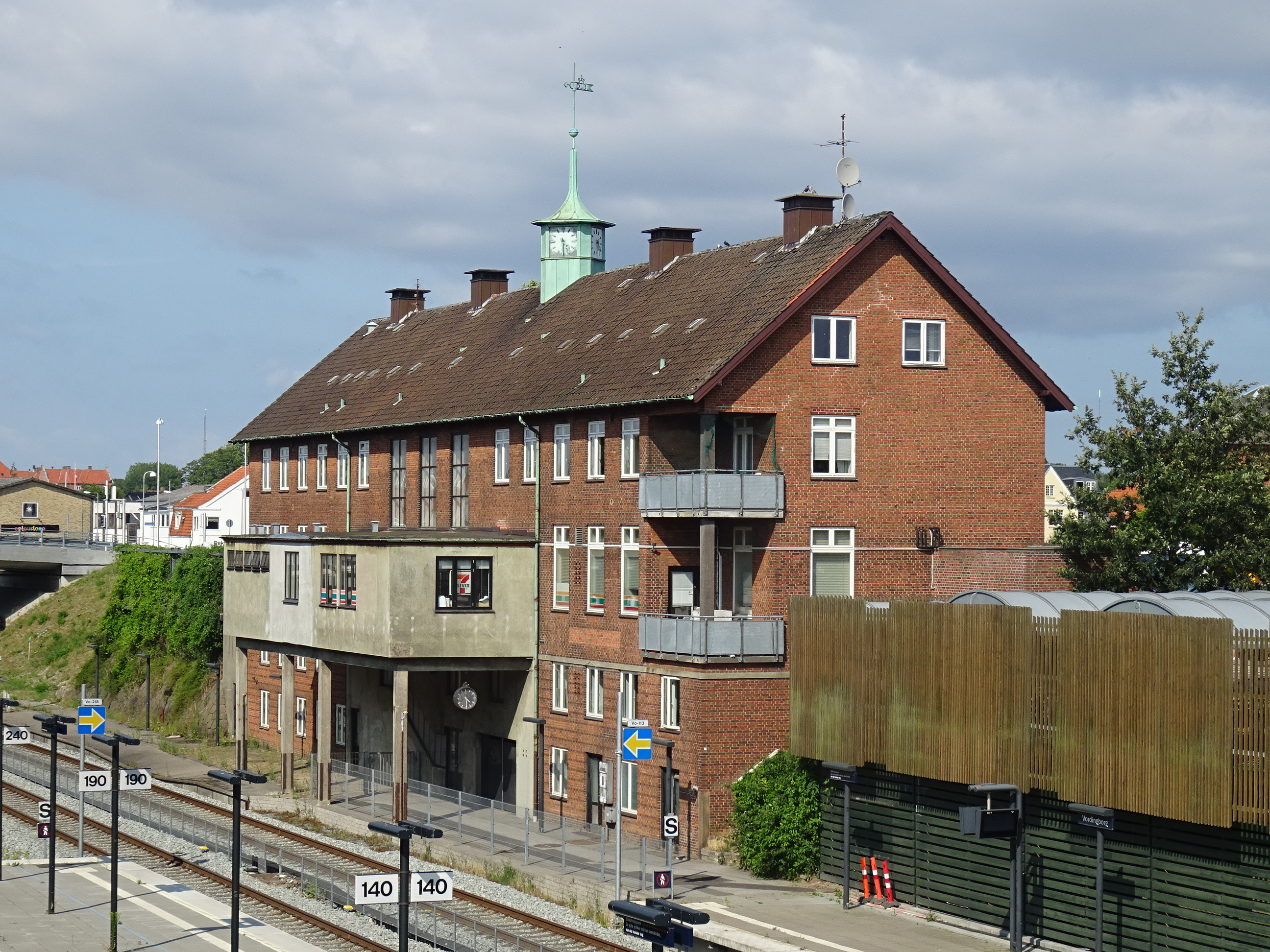
The station building in 2021.

Vordingborg station's first station building from 1870 was built to designs by the Danish architect Charles Abrahams (1838–1893).

The second station building from 1937 was built to designs by the Danish architect Knud Tanggaard Seest (1879–1972), known for the numerous railway stations he designed across Denmark in his capacity of head architect of the Danish State Railways.

== Facilities ==
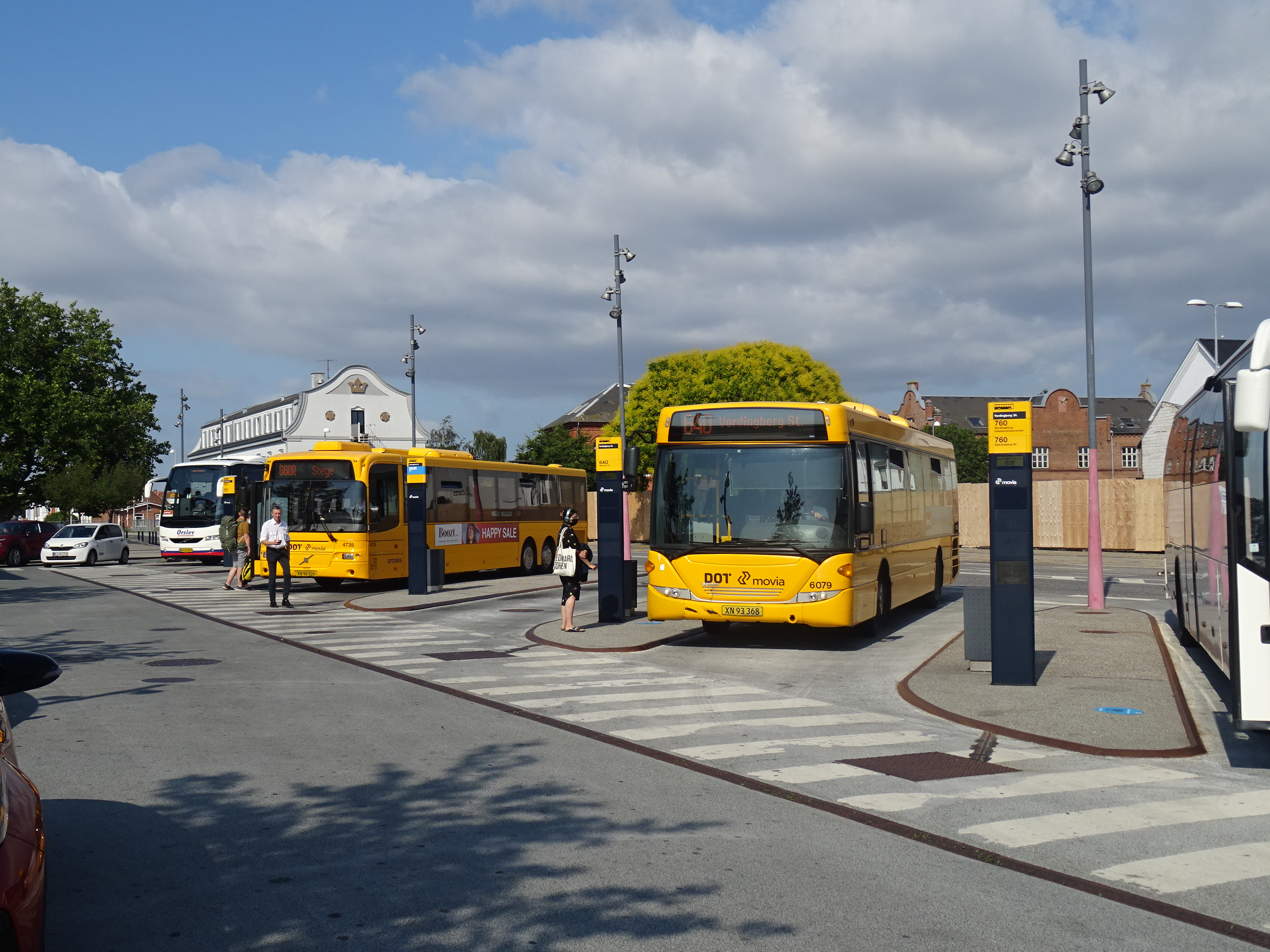
The Vordingborg bus station.

Inside the station building there is a combined ticket office and convenience store operated by 7-Eleven, ticket machines, waiting room and toilets.

Adjacent to the station is the Vordingborg bus station. The station forecourt has a taxi stand, and the station also has a bicycle parking station as well as a car park with approximately 173 parking spaces.

== See also ==
- List of railway stations in Denmark
- Rail transport in Denmark
- History of rail transport in Denmark
