= Lundby, Vordingborg =

Lundby
- Town
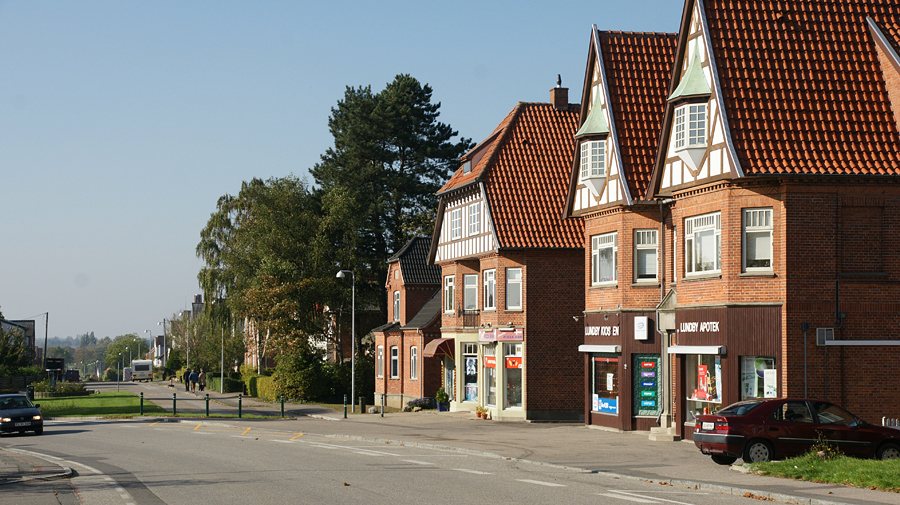
- Lundby's main street

- Location within Denmark Location within Denmark Region Zealand
- Coordinates: 55°06′31″N 11°52′32″E
- Country: Denmark
- Region: Region Zealand
- Municipality: Vordingborg Municipality

Area
  - Urban: 0.61 km^{2} (0.24 sq mi)

Population (2026)
  - Urban: 823
  - Urban density: 1,300/km^{2} (3,500/sq mi)
  - Summer (DST): UTC+1
- Postal code: 4750

Lundby is a small railway town, with a population of 823 (1 January 2026), located in Vordingborg Municipality in the southern part of Zealand, Denmark. Lundby Efterskole is located here.

Lundby is served by Lundby railway station located on the Sydbanen railway line, with hourly departures towards Næstved and Nykøbing F.

Preceding station	DSB	Following station
Næstved Terminus	Næstved–Nykøbing F Regional train	Vordingborg towards Nykøbing F
