= Ringsted railway station =

Railway station in Ringsted Municipality, Denmark

Ringsted Station Ringsted Banegård
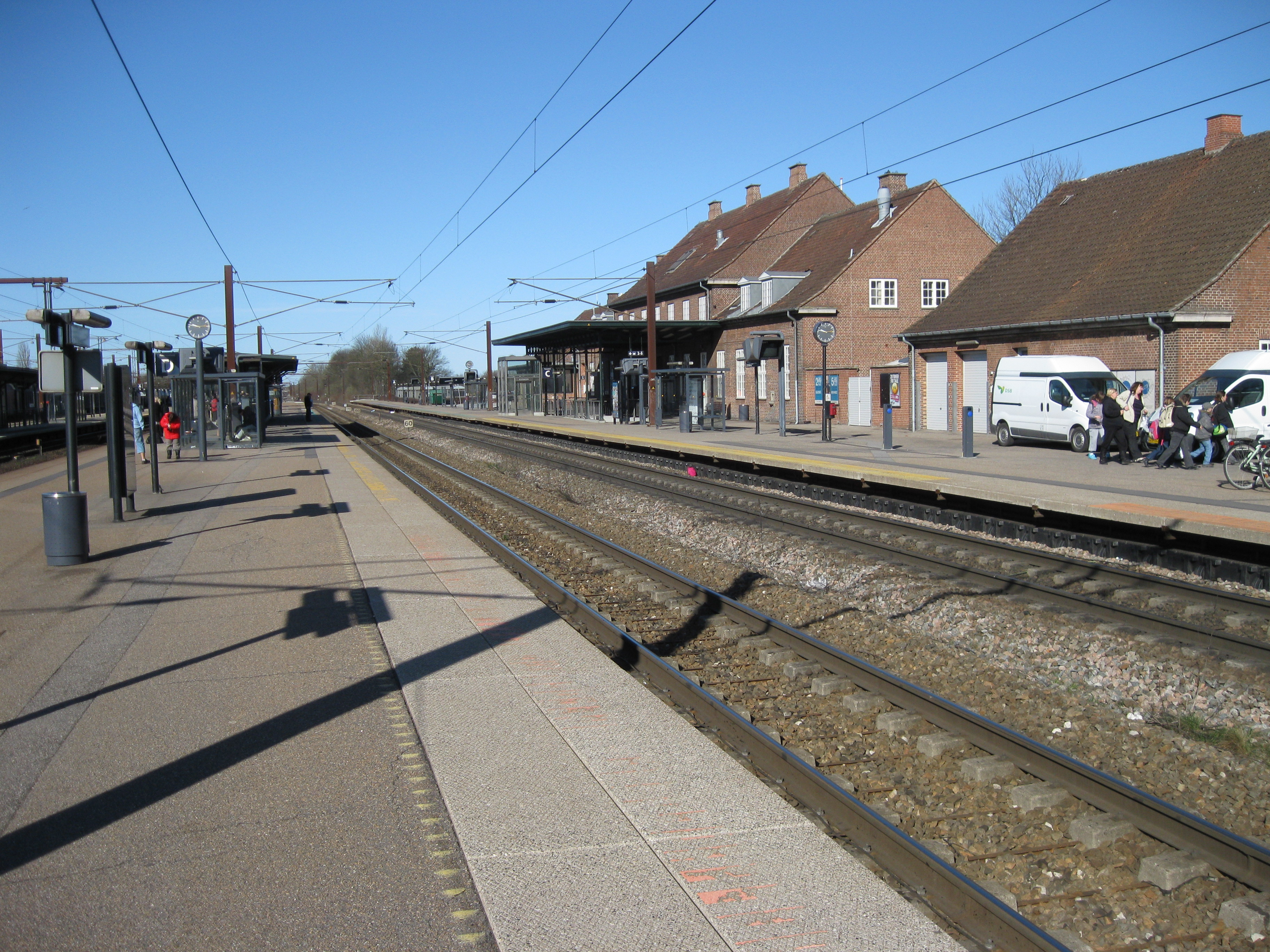
- Platform view of Ringsted station in 2011

General information
- Location: Jernbanevej 1 DK-4100 Ringsted; Ringsted Municipality; Denmark
- Coordinates: 55°26′17″N 11°47′11″E
- Elevation: 38.0 metres (124.7 ft)
- System: Railway junction
- Owner: DSB (station infrastructure); Banedanmark (rail infrastructure)
- Lines: Copenhagen–Fredericia/Taulov Line; Copenhagen–Ringsted Line; South Line; Køge–Ringsted Line (closed 1963)
- Platforms: 3
- Tracks: 5
- Train operators: DSB

Construction
- Architect: Fox, Henderson & Co. (1856); Knud Tanggaard Seest (1924)

History
- Opened: 27 April 1856
- Rebuilt: 1 June 1924

Services
Preceding station	DSB	Following station
Roskilde towards Copenhagen Central	Copenhagen-Aalborg InterCity	Sorø towards Aalborg Airport
Køge North towards Østerport	Copenhagen–Esbjerg InterCity	Sorø towards Esbjerg
Copenhagen Central Terminus	Copenhagen–Odense–Hamburg EuroCity	Odense towards Hamburg Hbf
Roskilde towards Copenhagen Airport	Copenhagen–Slagelse Regional train	Sorø towards Slagelse
Copenhagen South towards Copenhagen Central	Copenhagen–Nykøbing F Regional train	Næstved towards Nykøbing F
Borup towards Helsingør	Elsinore–Copenhagen– Roskilde–Næstved Regional train	Glumsø towards Næstved
Preceding station	České dráhy	Following station
Copenhagen Central Terminus	Railjet	Odense towards Praha hl.n.
Location
- Location within Denmark Location within Denmark Region Zealand

Ringsted railway station (Danish: Ringsted Station or Ringsted Banegård) is a railway station serving the town of Ringsted in central Zealand, Denmark. It is located in the centre of the town, on the southern edge of the historic town centre, and immediately adjacent to the Ringsted bus station.

Ringsted station is an important railway junction where the main line Copenhagen–Fredericia, Copenhagen–Ringsted, and South Line railway lines all meet. The station opened in 1856, and its second and current station building designed by the architect Knud Tanggaard Seest was inaugurated in 1924. The station offers direct Intercity rail services to Funen, Jutland and Copenhagen, as well as regional rail services to Copenhagen, Odense and Næstved, all operated by the national railway company DSB.

== History ==
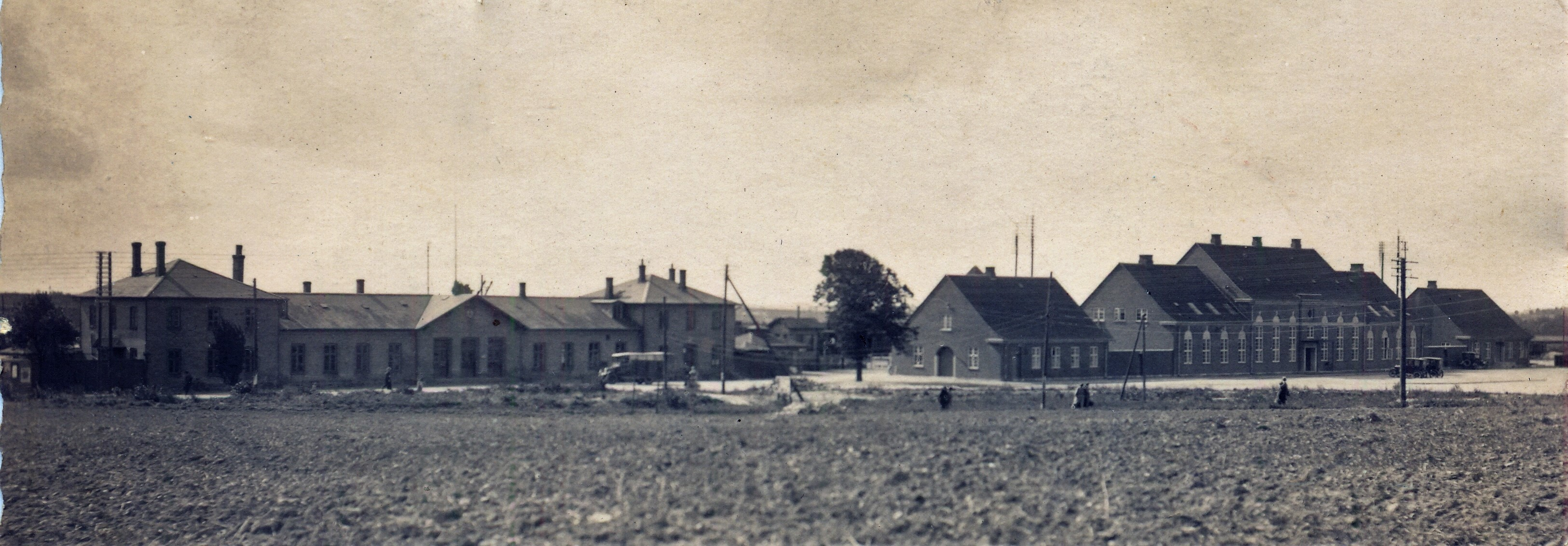
The old (left) and new (right) station buildings photographed in 1925.

Ringsted railway station opened on 27 April 1856, as the Copenhagen–Roskilde railway line from Copenhagen to Roskilde, the first railway line in the Kingdom of Denmark, (Note: The first railway line in the then Danish Monarchy was the Kiel-Altona railway line in the Duchy of Holstein which had been completed three years earlier. However, the Duchy of Holstein was later lost to the Kingdom of Prussia after the Second Schleswig War in 1864, and that railway line is today part of the German rail network.) was prolonged from Roskilde to the port city of Korsør on the west coast of Zealand by the Great Belt in 1856.

With the increasing traffic, the original station building from 1856 became too small, and in 1924 the second and current station building was inaugurated.

On 31 May 2019, a new high-speed railway line between Copenhagen and Ringsted via the new Køge North railway station was inaugurated.

== Architecture ==
The second and present station building from 1925 was designed by the Danish architect Knud Tanggaard Seest who was the head architect of the Danish State Railways from 1922 to 1949.

== Cultural references ==
Ringsted railway station is used as a location in the 1942 Danish comedy film Frk. Vildkat. It is also used as a location in an episode of DR television series Rejseholdet.

== See also ==
- List of railway stations in Denmark
- Rail transport in Denmark

== Notes and references ==
=== Bibliography ===
- Jensen, Niels (1972). Danske Jernbaner 1847–1892 (in Danish). Copenhagen: J.Fr. Clausens Forlag. ISBN 87-11-01765-1.
