= Little South Line =

Railway line in Denmark

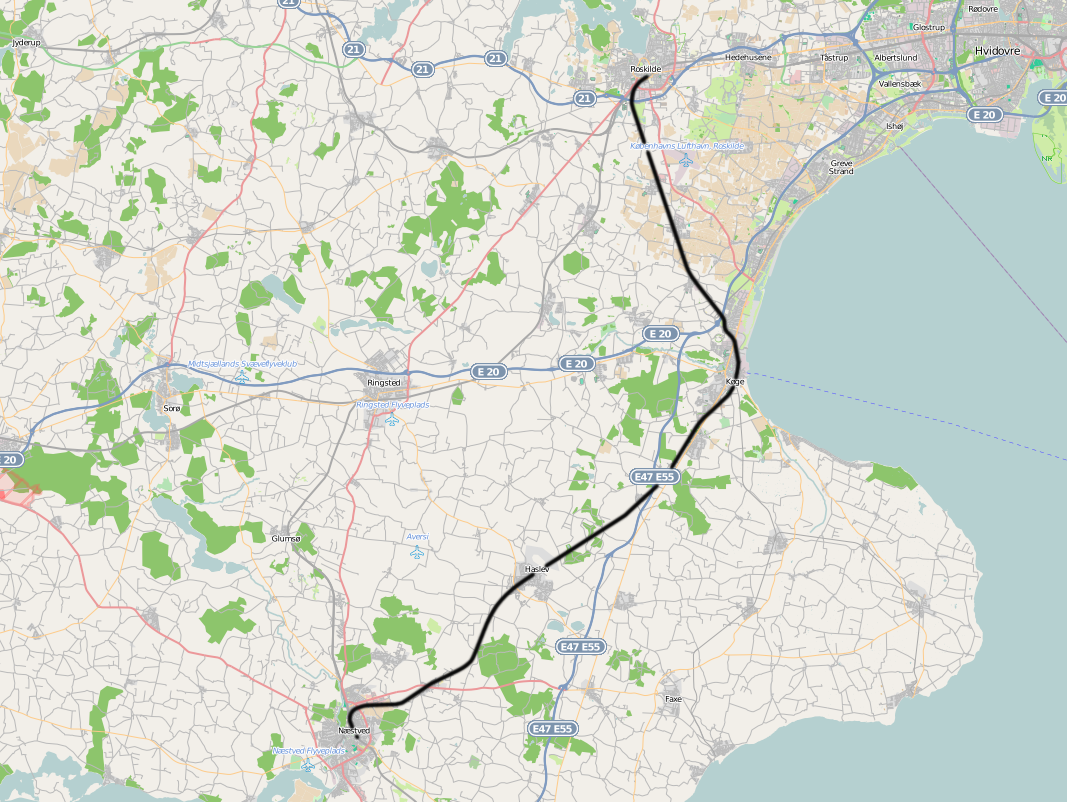
- Location map

Overview
- Native name: Lille Syd
- Owner: Banedanmark
- Termini: Roskilde; Næstved
- Stations: 13

Service
- Type: Railway
- System: Danish railways
- Operator: DSB
- Rolling stock: Alstom Coradia LINT

History
- Opened: 4 October 1870

Technical
- Line length: 61.4 km
- Number of tracks: Single
- Character: Passenger
- Track gauge: 1,435 mm (4 ft 8 1/2 in)
- Operating speed: 120 km/h

The Little South Line (Danish: Lille Syd) is a railway line on the Danish island of Zealand, formerly connecting the towns of Roskilde and Næstved by way of Køge.

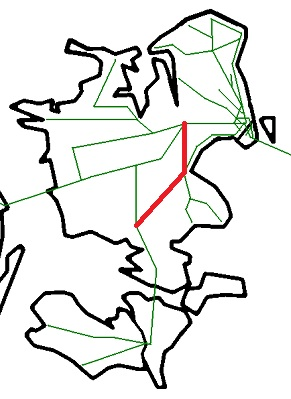
Little South Line

== History ==
The railway was built as part of the Zealand South Line (Danish: Sjællandske Sydbane) which was inaugurated on 4 October 1870. After 1924, most trains used the Ringsted-Næstved Line instead of Lille Syd.

In 2012, it was decided to electrify the section between Køge and Næstved. The works were completed in March 2019.

Since December 2020, the northern part of the Little South Line, between Køge and Roskilde, has been served by an extension of Østbanen. In April 2023, DSB started operating regional trains on the Næstved–Køge–Copenhagen route via the high speed Copenhagen–Køge Nord Line.

== Stations ==
Station	Location	Distance from Roskilde (km)	Distance from Næstved (km)
Roskilde station	Roskilde	0.0 km	61.4 km
Roskilde Festivalplads Station	Roskilde	3.7 km	57.7 km
Gadstrup station	Gadstrup	8.0 km	53.4 km
Havdrup station	Havdrup	11.5 km	49.9 km
Lille Skensved station	Lille Skensved	15.4 km	46.0 km
Ølby station	Ølby	19.6 km	41.8 km
Køge station	Køge	22.3 km	39.1 km
Herfølge station	Herfølge	27.9 km	33.5 km
Tureby station	Algestrup	34.2 km	27.2 km
Haslev station	Haslev	43.0 km	18.4 km
Holme-Olstrup station	Holme-Olstrup	53.9 km	7.5 km
Næstved Nord station	Næstved	58.2 km	3.2 km
Næstved station	Næstved	61.4 km	0.0 km

== See also ==
- South Line (Denmark)
- Little North Line
- List of railway lines in Denmark
