= Lille Skensved =

- town
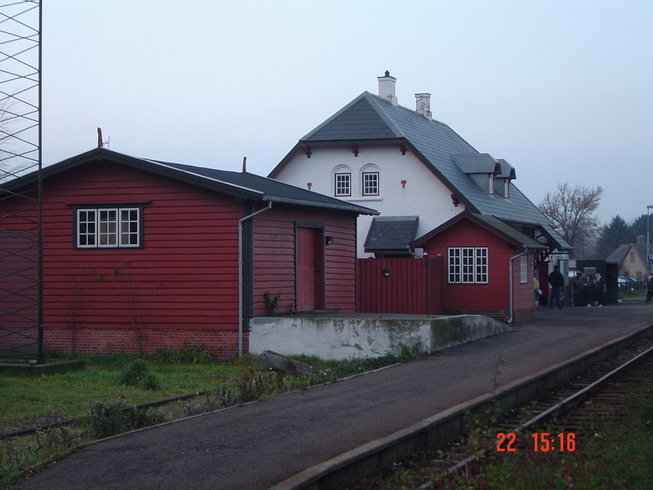
- Lille Skensved railway station

- Location in Denmark Lille Skensved (Denmark Region Zealand)
- Coordinates: 55.51036°N 12.13543°E
- Country: Denmark
- Region: Zealand (Sjælland)
- Municipality: Køge and Solrød

Area
  - Urban: 1.2 km^{2} (0.46 sq mi)

Population (2026)
  - Urban: 1,696
  - Urban density: 1,400/km^{2} (3,700/sq mi)
- Time zone: UTC+1 (CET)
  - Summer (DST): UTC+2 (CEST)
- Postal code: DK-4623 Lille Skensved
- Website: lilleskensved.dk

Lille Skensved is a small railway town located in Køge and Solrød municipalities, at the railway line Lille Syd between Roskilde and Køge about 7 kilometres north of Køge. The total population of Lille Skensved is 1,696 (1 January 2026), 1,630 in Køge Municipality and 66 in Solrød Municipality.

The towns largest workplace is CP Kelco Aps, since November 2024 a part of Tate & Lyle. It is the largest plant in the world producing pectin, carrageenan and refined locust bean gum.

== Notable people ==
- DJ Noize (born 1975 in Lille Skensved) a Danish Hip hop-DJ,
