= Algestrup =

- Town
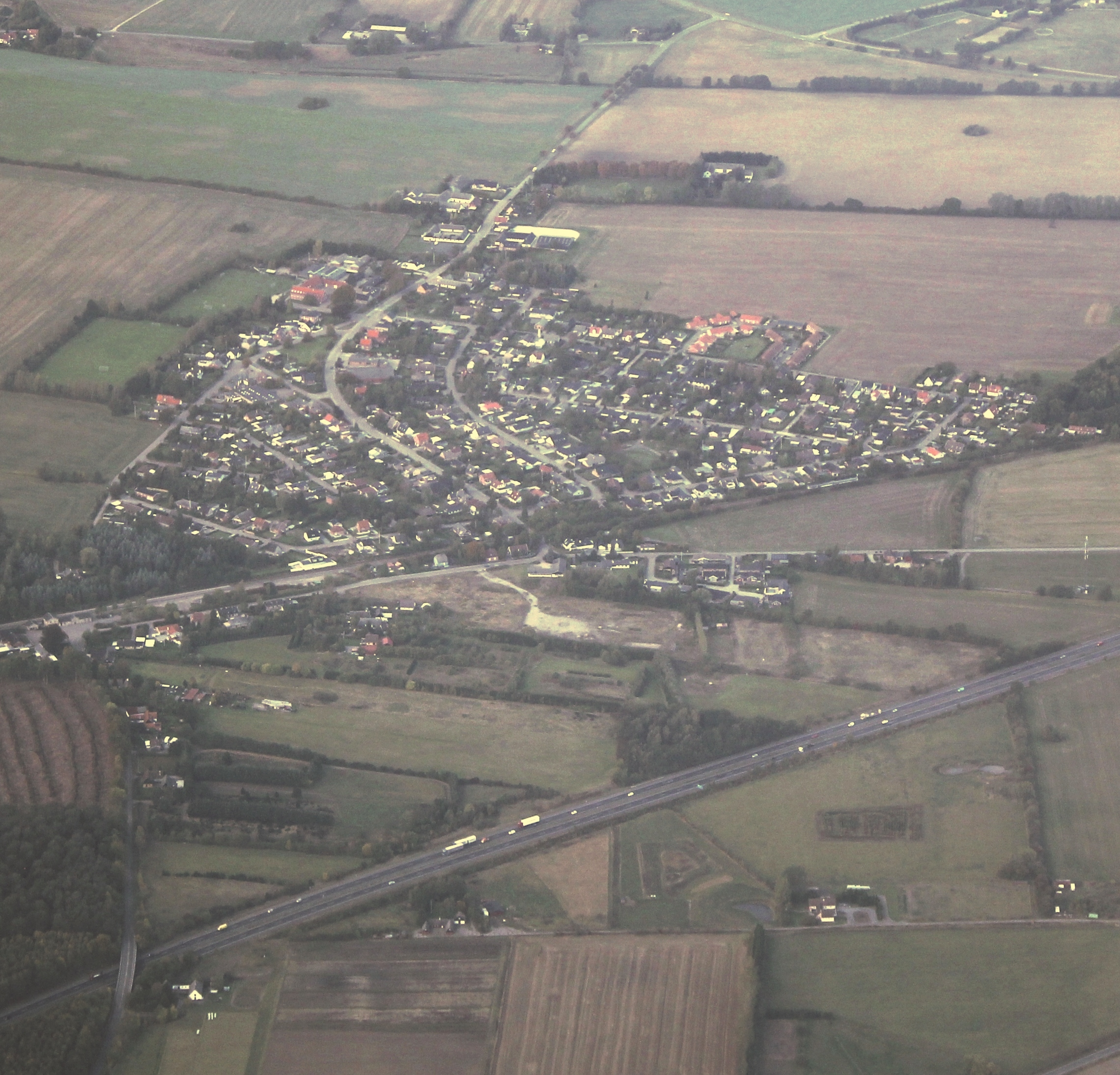
- Aerial photograph of Algestrup (2012)

- Location in Region Zealand Algestrup (Denmark)
- Coordinates: 55°22′34″N 12°4′47″E
- Country: Denmark
- Region: Region Zealand
- Municipality: Køge Municipality

Population (2026)
  - Total: 952
- Time zone: UTC+1 (CET)
  - Summer (DST): UTC+2 (CEST)

Algestrup is a small railway town with a population of 952 (1 January 2026). The town is located in the southern part of Køge Municipality in Region Zealand, Denmark, just north of the boundary between Køge and Faxe Municipality, on the Little South railway line between Køge and Haslev.

In spite of the fact that a railway station is located in the southern part of Algestrup, the station is not named Algestrup but Tureby, named after two manor houses Turebylille and Turebyholm in Faxe Municipality about 2 and 4 kilometres south of the station.
