= South Line (Denmark) =

Railway line on Zealand, Denmark

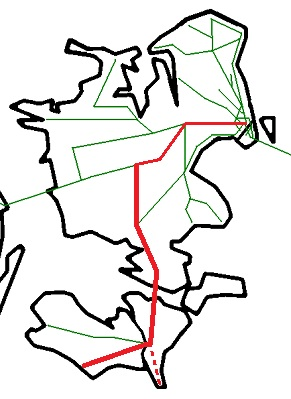

Overview
- Native name: Sydbanen
- Owner: Banedanmark
- Termini: Østerport (formally Ringsted); Nykøbing Falster, Gedser, Rødbyhavn
- Stations: 9

Service
- Type: High-speed rail
- Operator(s): DSB

History
- Planned opening: 2024 (partial); 2027 (whole)

Technical
- Line length: 142.3 km (88.4 mi)
- Track gauge: 1,435 mm (4 ft 8 1/2 in) standard gauge
- Operating speed: 200 km/h (125 mph)
- Signalling: ERTMS
Route map
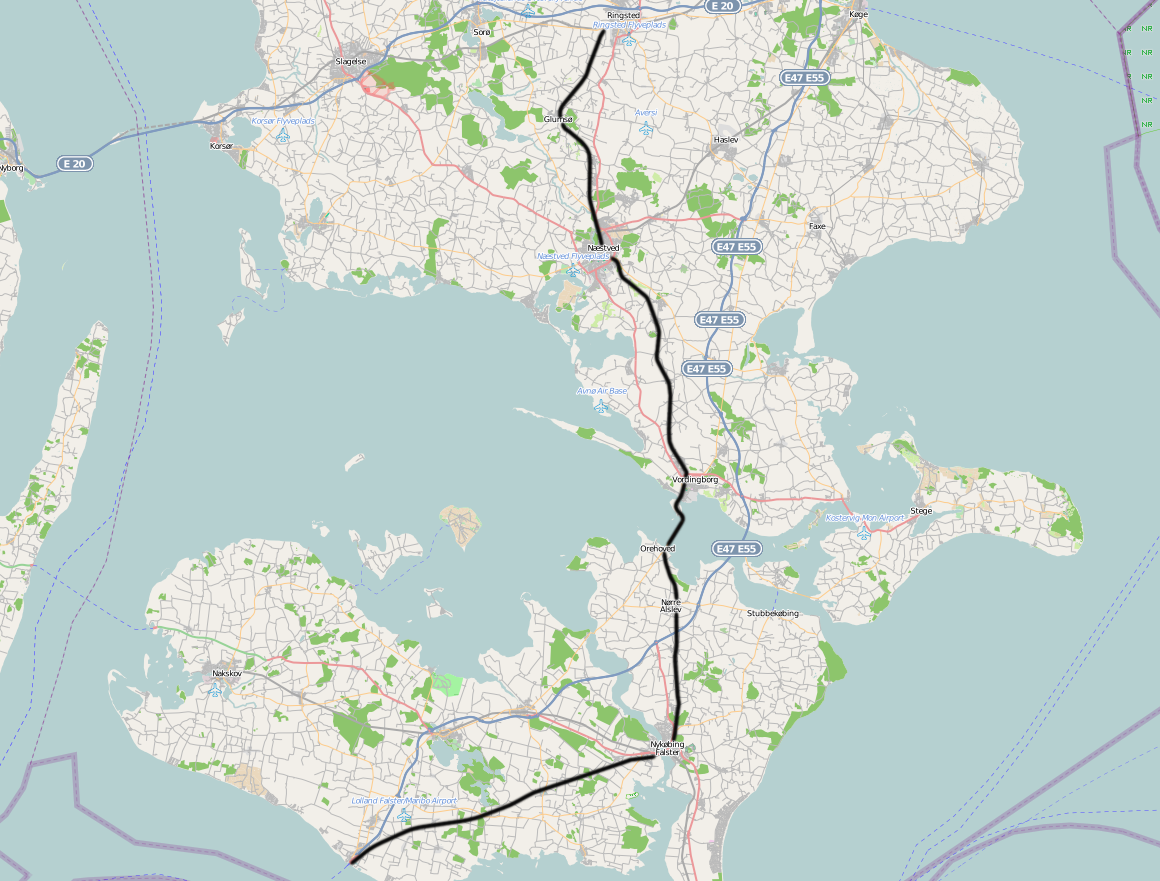

The South Line (Danish: Sydbanen) is a government-owned railway line in Denmark. Technically, the line connects Ringsted with Nykøbing Falster, from which it branches to Gedser and Rødbyhavn. In practice, Ringsted is not the terminal station, so the line is often said to continue to Copenhagen.

The railway is part of the Vogelfluglinie from Copenhagen to Hamburg. On Sydbanen's southwestern end at Rødby, a Scandlines ferry line exists to the German coastal town of Puttgarden, from where the Lübeck–Puttgarden railway and Lübeck–Hamburg railway lead to Hamburg. The Fehmarn Belt Tunnel, to be completed in 2029, will replace the ferry service. From 2020 until 2028 trains go only to Nykøbing, with frequent closures due to rebuilding.

== History ==
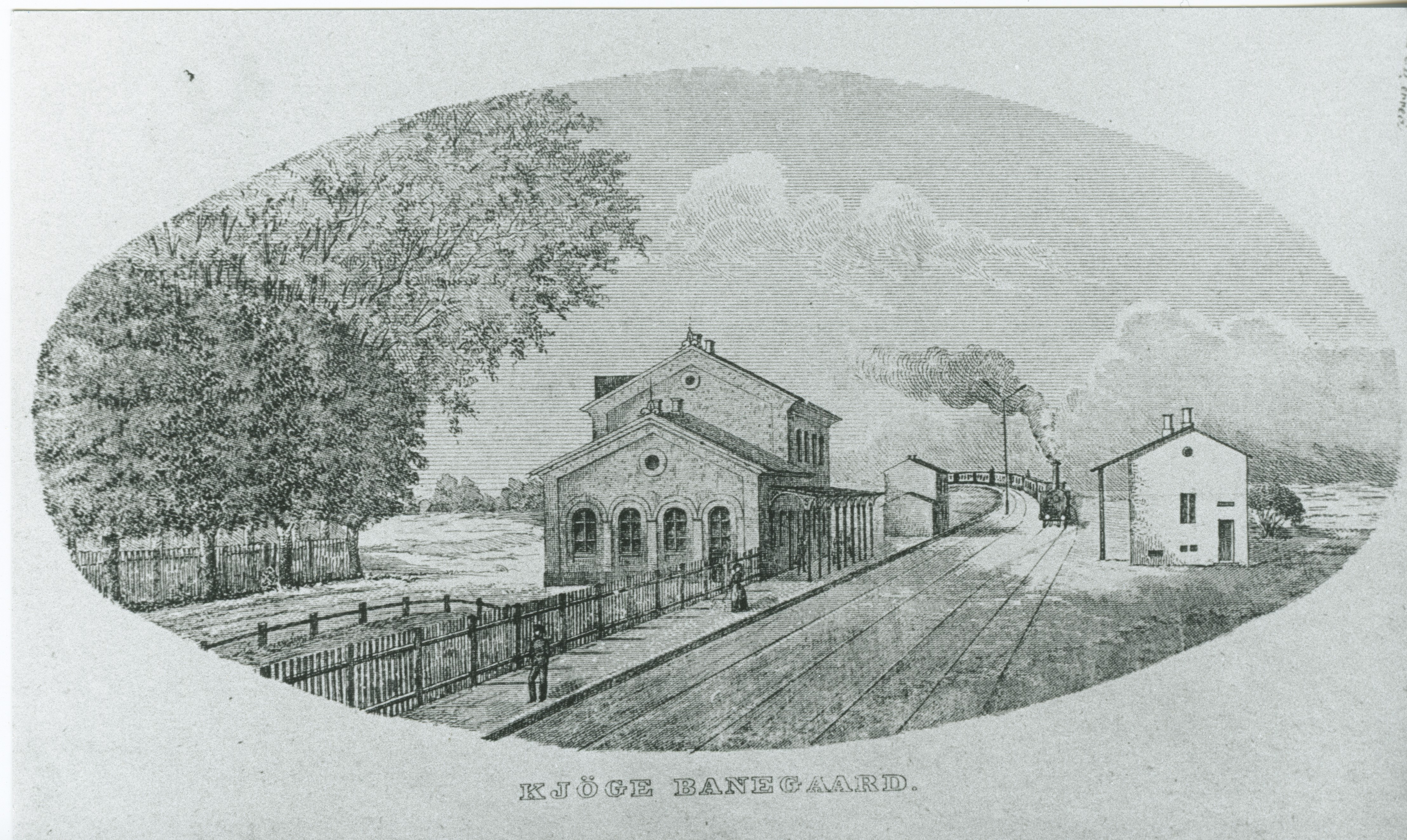
The first station in Køge on the original Zealand South Line.

The original Zealand South Line was completed for the privately owned Zealand Railway Company (Danish: Det Sjællandske Jernbaneselskab) and opened on 4 October 1870. It connected Roskilde (and thus Copenhagen via the West Line) with Masnedsund on the south coast of Zealand via Køge, Næstved and Vordingborg. From Masnedsund there was a steamship connection across the Storstrømmen strait to Orehoved on the north coast of the island of Falster. In 1884, the ferry crossing was shortened to Masnedø–Orehoved after the construction of the first Masnedsund Bridge between Zealand and Masnedø and construction of a railway across Masnedø.

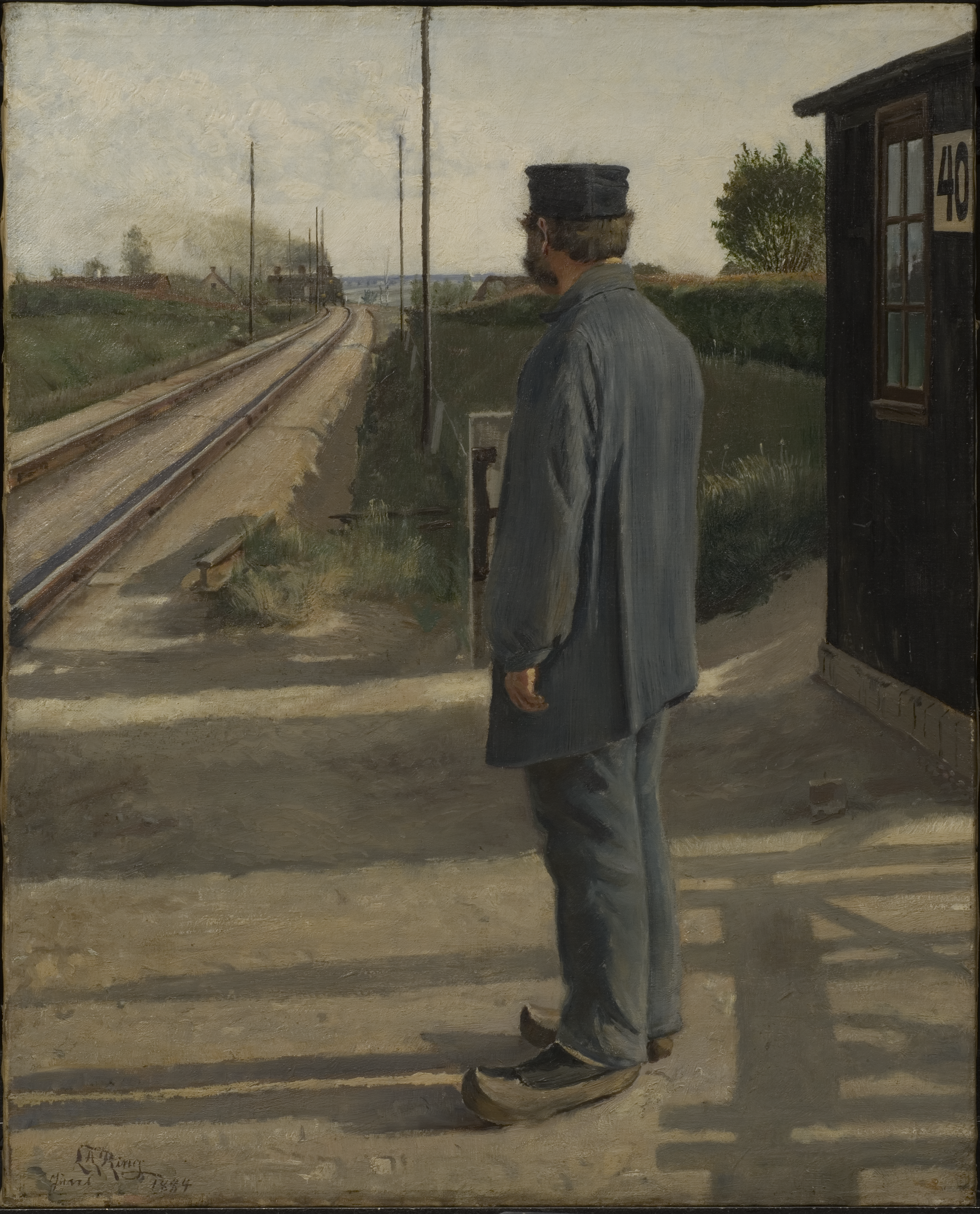
The Lineman. A gateman at work at a gated level crossing of the South Line in the village of Ring in South Zealand. Painting by L. A. Ring, 1884.

In 1880, the Zealand Railway Company was taken over by the Danish state, and in 1885 became part of the national railway company DSB. After the opening of the Ringsted-Næstved Line in 1924, most trains between Copenhagen and South Zealand used the route via Ringsted instead of the original route via Køge. The rump section between Roskilde and Næstved via Køge became known as the Little South Line (Danish: Lille Syd).

On 26 September 1937, at the opening of the Storstrøm Bridge that crosses the Storstrømmen strait between the islands of Masnedø and Falster, the South Line was connected directly with Falster, the Falster Railway and the rest of the rail network in Lolland-Falster.

== Future developments ==
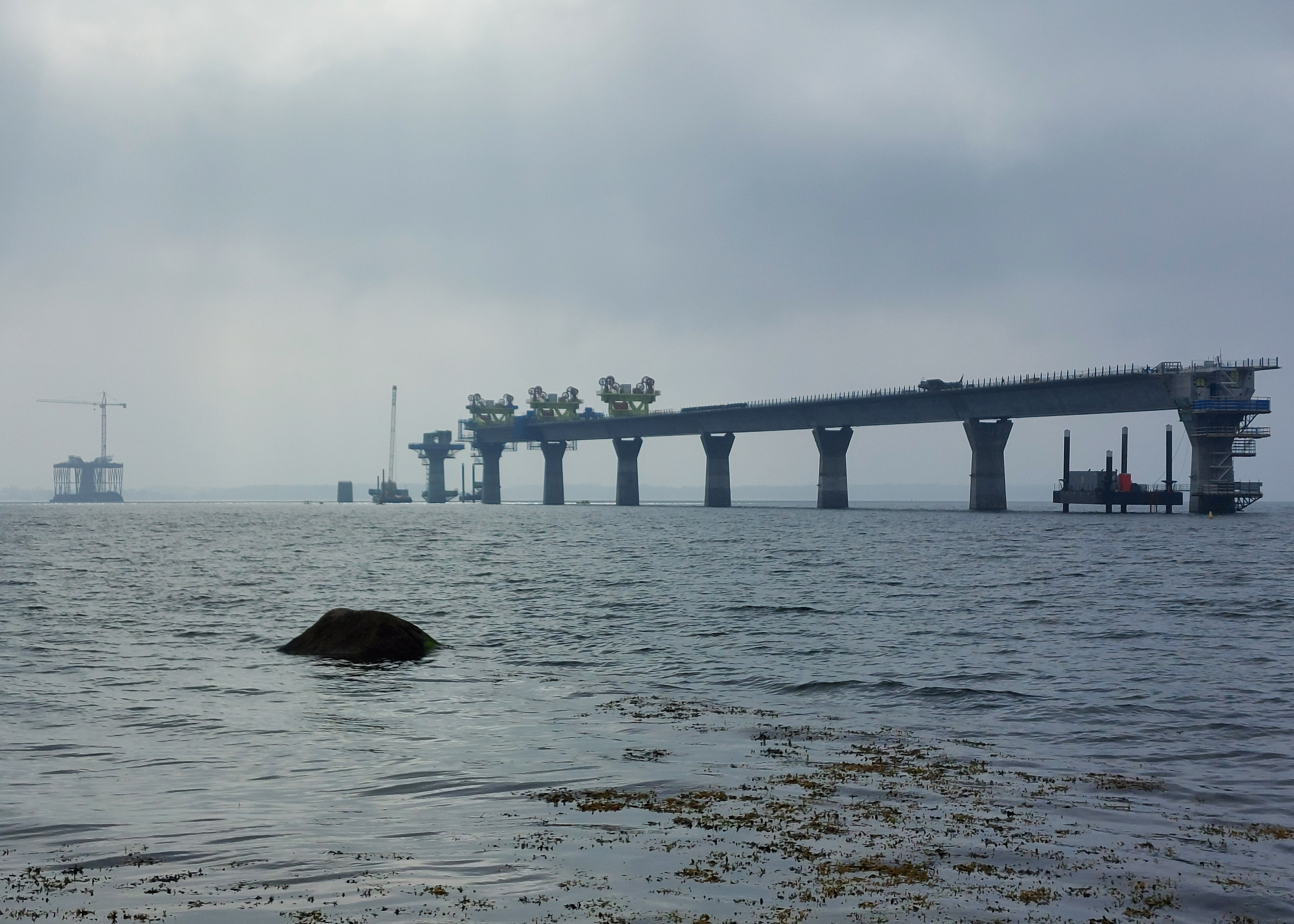
The new Storstrøm Bridge under construction

The line is being upgraded to ERTMS, (Køge-)Næstved-Nykøbing in 2021, and the rest in 2028. Furthermore, 55 km of new tracks are being laid, to smooth out curves, allowing for 200 km/h (125 mph) when done. These works are expected to finish in 2021. Afterwards, the line will be electrified, slated for partial introduction in 2024, and completion all the way in 2027 when a new Storstrøm Bridge will open. The railway Nykøbing–Rødby will be in operation only when the Fehmarn Belt Tunnel is opened around 2029.

== Route ==
Between Copenhagen and Næstved there are four routes that trains can use:

- over Roskilde and Ringsted
- over Roskilde and Haslev
- over Køge North and Ringsted (as of 2023 most used)
- over Køge North and Haslev

== Stations ==
Stations with passenger stops from Ringsted and southbound are:

- Ringsted
- Glumsø
- Næstved
- Lundby
- Vordingborg
- Nørre Alslev
- Eskilstrup
- Nykøbing Falster
- Rødby Færge, was closed for traffic 2021
- Rødby, will open for traffic 2029
