= Glumsø =

- Town
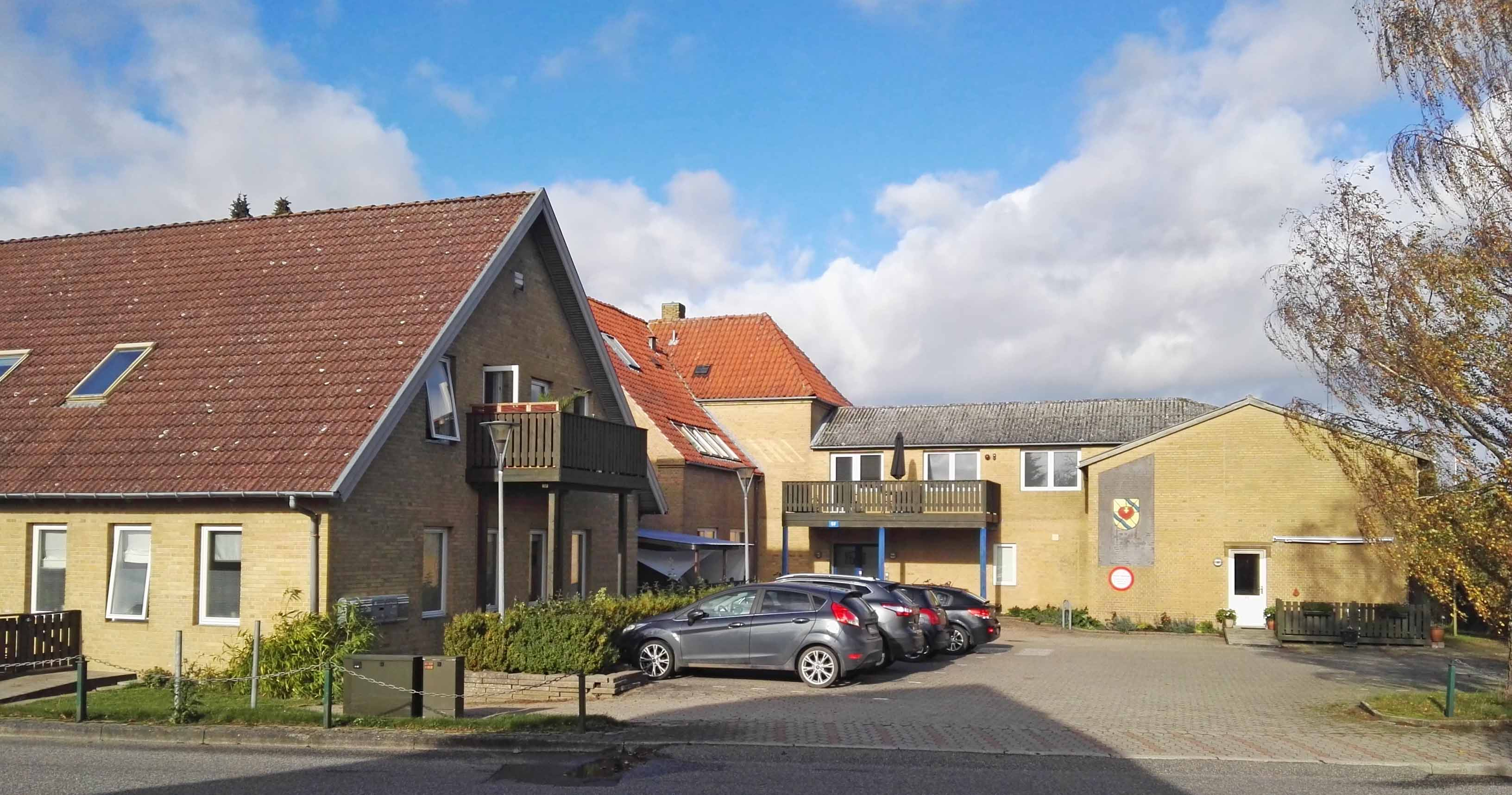
- Glumsø

- Location within Denmark Location within Denmark Region Zealand
- Coordinates: 55°21′21″N 11°41′15″E
- Country: Denmark
- Region: Region Zealand
- Municipality: Næstved Municipality

Area
  - Total: 1.4 km^{2} (0.54 sq mi)

Population (2026)
  - Total: 2,269
  - Density: 1,600/km^{2} (4,200/sq mi)
- Postal code: 4171

Glumsø is a railway town, with a population of 2,269 (1. January 2026), located on the southern part of Zealand in Denmark. Until 1.January 2007 it was the seat of Suså Municipality.

Glumsø Station is located in Glumsø, serving the Sydbanen line. The station was heavily redesigned in late 2009.

== Landmarks ==
Local landmarks include Glumsø Church, the heritage listed Glumsø Rectory and the manor house Næsbyholm.

== Notable people ==
- Christian Frederik Bielke (1670–1709) a Danish military officer, from 1673 to 1709 the owner of Næsbyholm
- Mikkel Bech (born 1994 in Næstved) a Danish speedway rider, raised in Glumsø.

Preceding station	DSB	Following station
Ringsted towards Østerport (formally Ringsted)	Sydbanen	Næstved towards Rødby Færge or Gedser
