= Haslev Church =

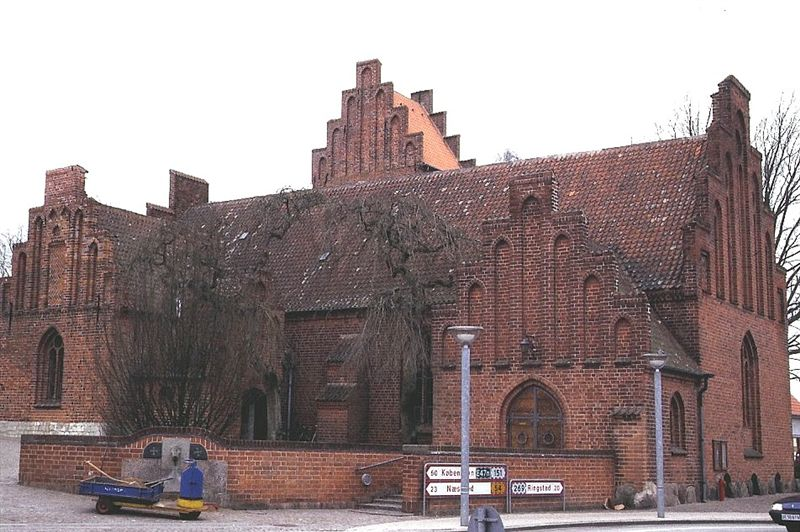
- Haslev Church
- Haslev Church
- 55°19′23″N 11°57′49″E
- Denomination: Church of Denmark
- Previous denomination: Catholic

History
- Dedication: Evangelical Lutheran

Haslev Church (Danish: Haslev Kirke) is a church located in the town of Haslev, Diocese of Roskilde, Faxe Municipality in Region Sjælland on the Danish island of Zealand. The oldest parts of the church were built in the 12th century but today's structure is the result of its rebuilding in 1916.

== History ==
The first church in Haslev was probably a wooden structure built in the 11th century although nothing remains of it today. In the 12th century, limestone was used to build a small church, 16 metres (52 ft) long and 6 metres (20 ft) wide, with a nave, a chancel and an apse. Its foundations were discovered during the reconstruction work from 1914 to 1916.

In the 13th century, the building was extended 4 metres (13 ft) to the west. The apse was removed and the chancel was extended to the east. The rounded window on the north side dates from this period. During comprehensive rebuilding in the 14th century, the width was extended to 9 metres and a new roof with three cross vaults was added, meeting the prevailing standards. At the beginning of the 15th century, a new stepped gable was built at the eastern end, a sacristy was added to the north and a porch to the south, reflecting the Gothic style of the times. The tower, 21 metres (69 ft) high, was added in the mid-14th century while a chapel was built on the north side at the end of the century.

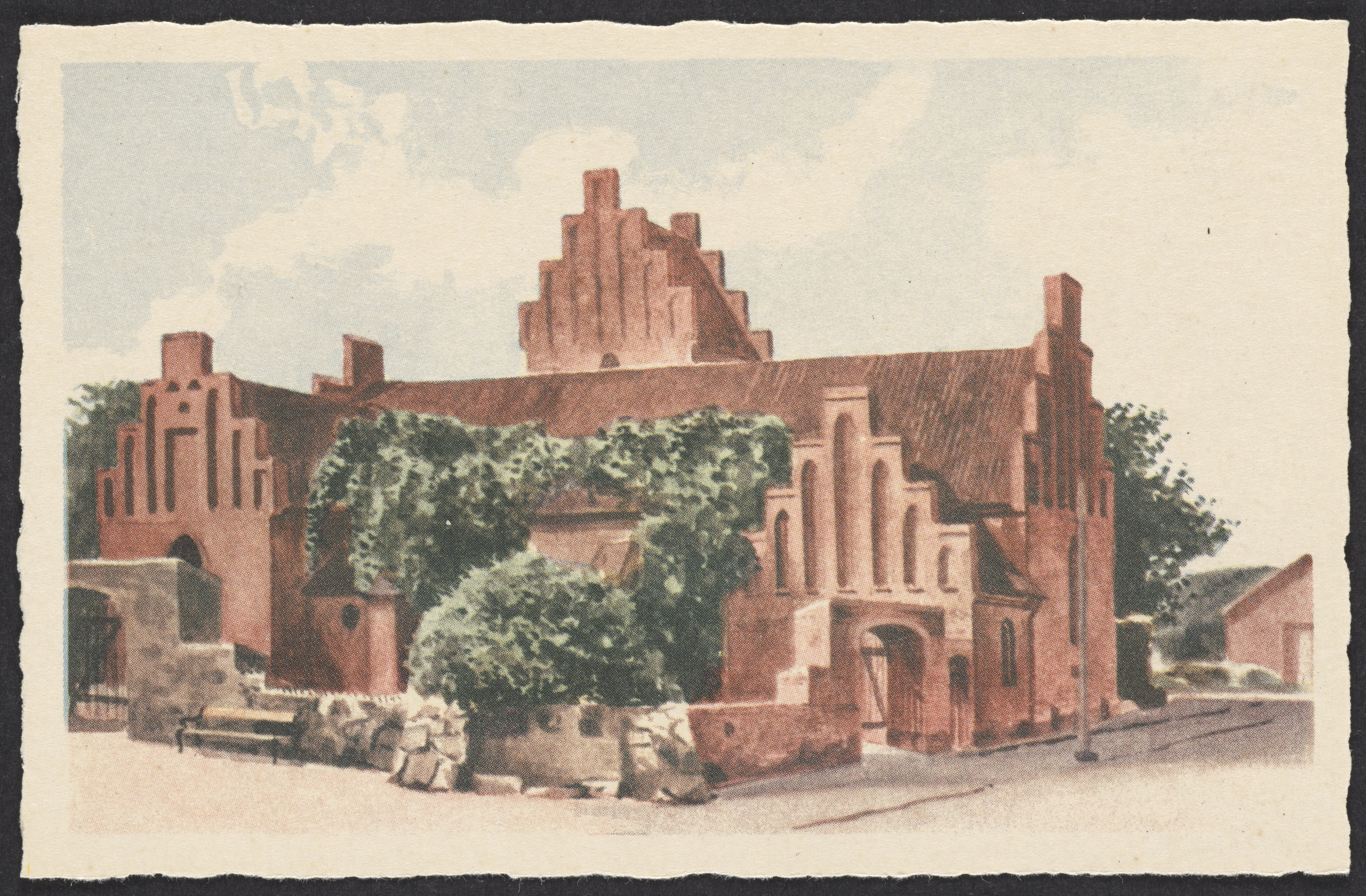
Haslev Church depicted by Johan Daniel Herholdt.

In 1870, Haslev became a railway town, attracting many new inhabitants. The architect H. Lønborg-Jensen planned an extension that consisted of building a new church that crossed transversely through the old one. The old church thus became a parallel aisle in the new cross-shaped structure and the old chancel became the east entrance. The new building with seating for 641 and an altar to the south was consecrated on 2 April 1916.

== Interior ==
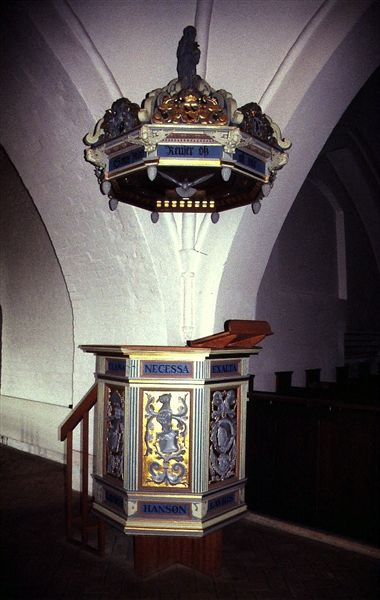
Pulput (1579)

The carved wooden pulpit from 1579 is one of the oldest in Denmark. In 1967 it was restored and repainted by the National Museum. The canopy came later in 1640. The old decorated pews from the mid-16th century have been preserved. The seats decorated with the arms of the counts of Bregentved are particularly impressive.

The organ, with 36 stops, was built in 1978 by Poul Gerhard Andersen, one of the leading organ builders of his day. The font, completed in 1935, was built in accordance with plans prepared by the church's architect Lønborg-Jensen.

== Burials ==
- Frederik Urne (1601-1658), lensmann (inside the church)
- Peter Cecilius Davidsen (1866-1935), educator
- Frede Halleløv (1887-1969), architect
- Johannes Juul (1887-1969), engineer and inventor
- Vilhelm Møller-Christensen (1903-1988), medical doctor, and medicinal historian

== See also ==
- Faxe Municipality
- List of churches in Faxe Municipality
