= Nykøbing Falster railway station =

Railway station in Nykøbing Falster, Denmark

Nykøbing F
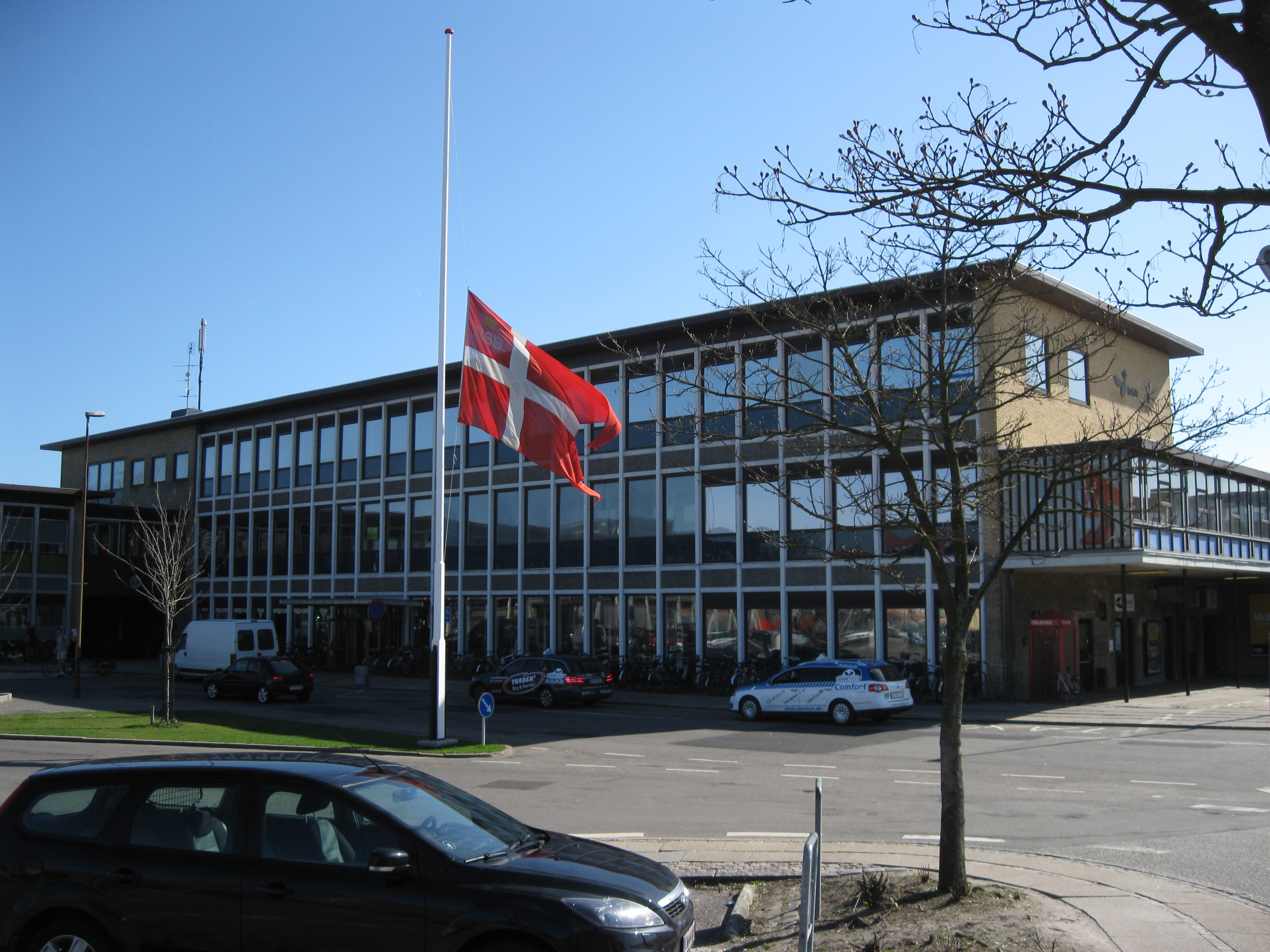
- The station building in 2011

General information
- Location: Banegårdspladsen 2; 4800 Nykøbing Falster; Guldborgsund Municipality; Denmark
- Coordinates: 54°46′01.43″N 11°52′38.48″E
- Elevation: 2.3 metres (7 ft 7 in)
- Owner: DSB (station infrastructure); Banedanmark (rail infrastructure)
- Lines: South Line; Lolland Line; Gedser Line
- Platforms: 3
- Tracks: 5
- Train operators: DSB; Lokaltog
- Connections: Bus terminal

Construction
- Architect: H. C. Scharling (1872); Ole Ejnar Bonding (1962)

Other information
- Website: Official website

History
- Opened: 22 August 1872
- Rebuilt: 1962

Services
Preceding station	DSB	Following station
Vordingborg towards Copenhagen Central	Copenhagen–Nykøbing F Regional train	Terminus
Eskilstrup towards Næstved	Næstved–Nykøbing F Regional train	Terminus
Preceding station	Lokaltog	Following station
Terminus	Lolland Line Local train	Øster Toreby towards Nakskov
Location

Nykøbing Falster railway station (Danish: Nykøbing Falster Station or Nykøbing Falster Banegård, often abbreviated Nykøbing F) is a railway station serving the city of Nykøbing Falster on the island of Falster, Denmark. It is located in the centre of the town, on the eastern edge of the historic town centre, and immediately adjacent to the Nykøbing Falster bus terminal.

The station is located on the South Line which links Copenhagen with southern Zealand and the islands of Falster and Lolland. It is also the eastern terminus of the Lolland Line which links Nykøbing Falster with Maribo and Nakskov.

The station opened together with the Falster Railway in 1872, and its second and current station building designed by the architect Ole Ejnar Bonding was inaugurated in 1963 as a part of the Fugleflugtslinjen transport corridor between Copenhagen and Hamburg. International trains operating between Copenhagen and Berlin called at the station until 1995. International trains operating between Copenhagen and Hamburg called at the station until 2019, but are temporarily re-routed via the Great Belt Bridge and Flensburg, until the opening of the Fehmarn Belt fixed link, expected to be completed in 2029.

== History ==
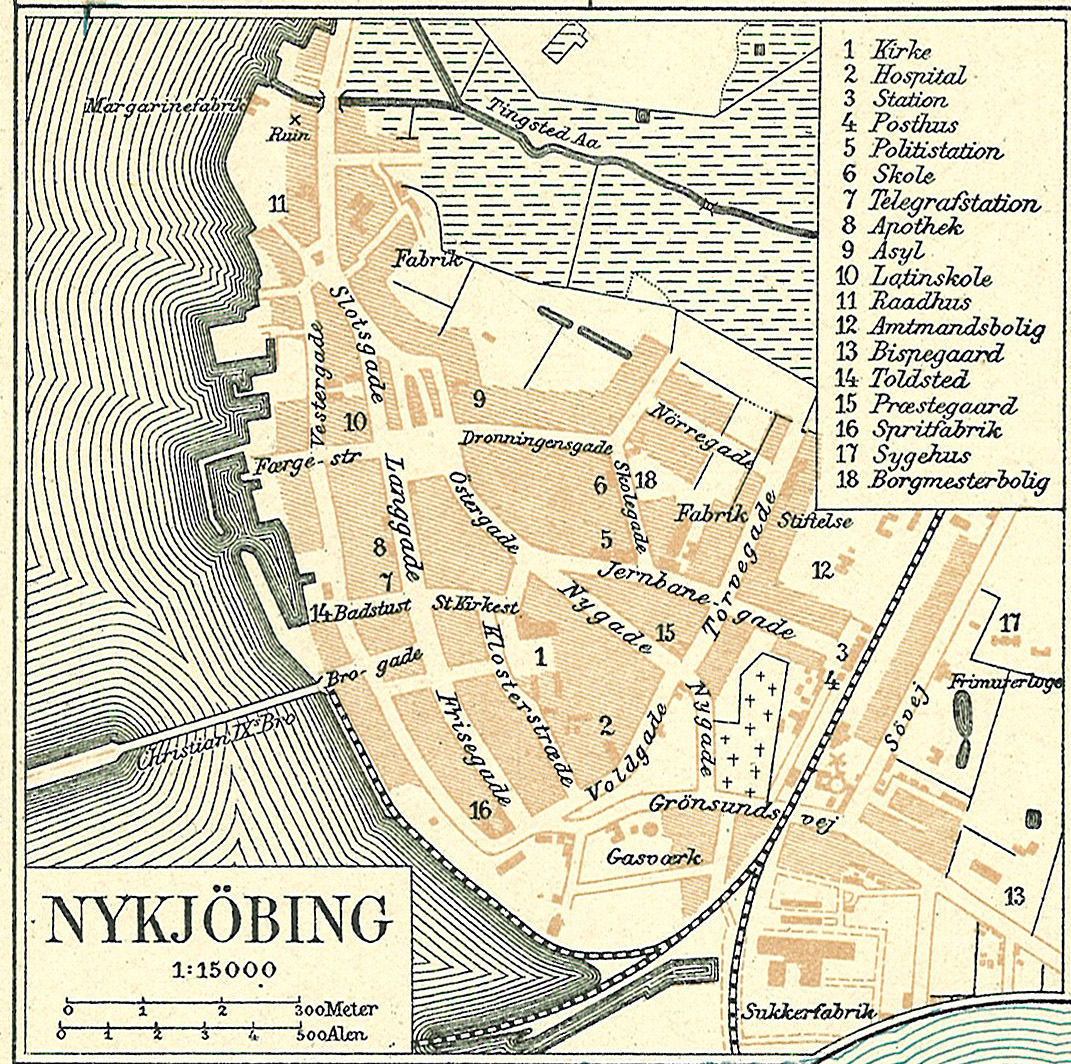
Map of Nykøbing Falster, c. 1900.

The railway station in Nykøbing Falster opened on the 22 August 1872 as the southern terminus of the Falster Railway from Nykøbing Falster to Orehoved on the north coast of the island of Falster. From Orehoved there was a ferry crossing across the Storstrømmen strait to Zealand at Masnedsund. In 1884, the ferry crossing was shortened to Orehoved–Masnedø after the construction of the first Masnedsund Bridge between Zealand and Masnedø and construction of a railway across Masnedø. On 26 September 1936, at the opening of the Storstrøm Bridge that crosses Storstrømmen between the islands of Falster and Masnedø, the Falster Railway was connected with Zealand, the South Line and the rest of the Danish rail network.

In 1875, the first railway bridge across the Guldborgsund strait was inaugurated, and Nykøbing station was connected to the Lolland Line which had opened in 1874. And in 1886, the Gedser Line between Nykøbing Falster and Gedser was inaugurated. In 1910, a railway line opened from the station to Stubbekøbing, followed by a railway line to Nysted in 1911.

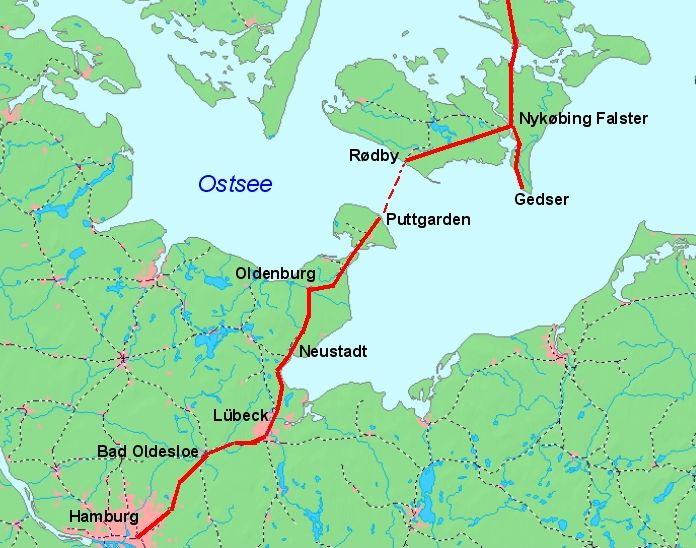
Nykøbing Falster station's location on the Fugleflugtslinjen transport corridor between Copenhagen and Hamburg which was completed in 1963.

After World War II, political divisions made traffic between Denmark and West Germany by the traditional route via Gedser and Warnemünde (near Rostock) inconvenient, as Warnemünde was now included in the territory of East Germany. Construction of a more direct transport corridor between Copenhagen and Hamburg, the Fugleflugtslinjen (English: the bird flight line) was started in 1949 and completed in 1963. It included, among other things, a new direct railway line from Nykøbing Falster to Rødby Ferry, as well as a new station building at Nykøbing Falster.

International trains operating between Copenhagen and Berlin by the traditional route via Gedser and Warnemünde continued to call at the station until that service ceased in 1995. International trains operating between Copenhagen and Hamburg by the Fugleflugtslinjen via Rødby and Puttgarden continued to call at the station until 2019, when they were re-routed via the Great Belt Bridge and Flensburg during the construction of the Fehmarn Belt fixed link, expected to be completed in 2029.

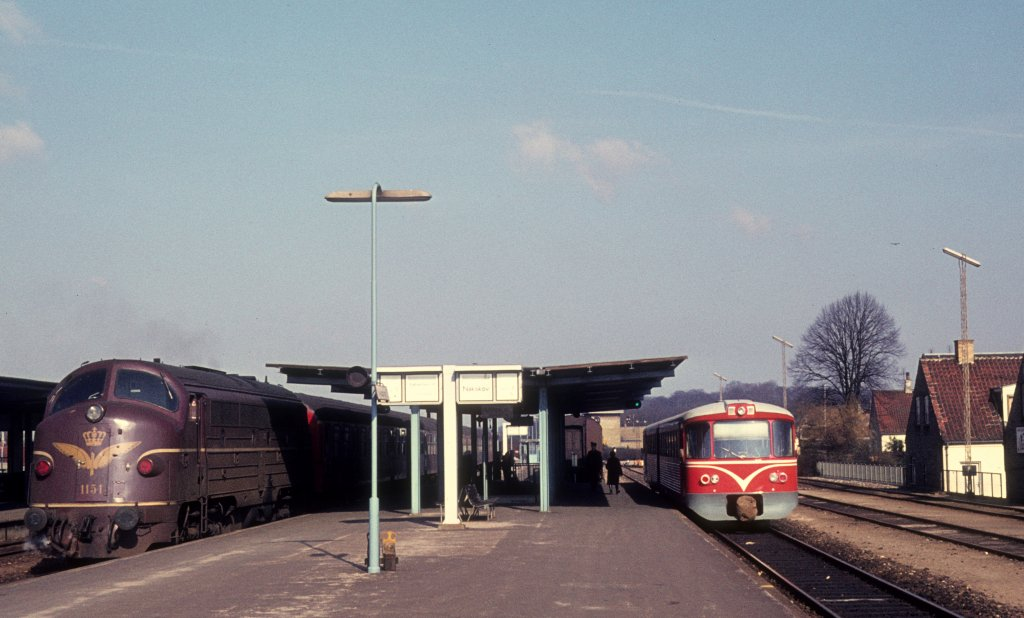
Trains at Nykøbing Falster railway station in 1974.

Both the Nykøbing-Stubbekøbing and Nykøbing-Nysted railway lines were closed in 1966 - passenger traffic on the Nysted line, however, was already closed in 1961. Traffic on the Gedser Line ceased in 2009, although the rails are still there, so that today only the Lolland Line remains as the only branch line from Nykøbing Falster Station.

== Architecture ==
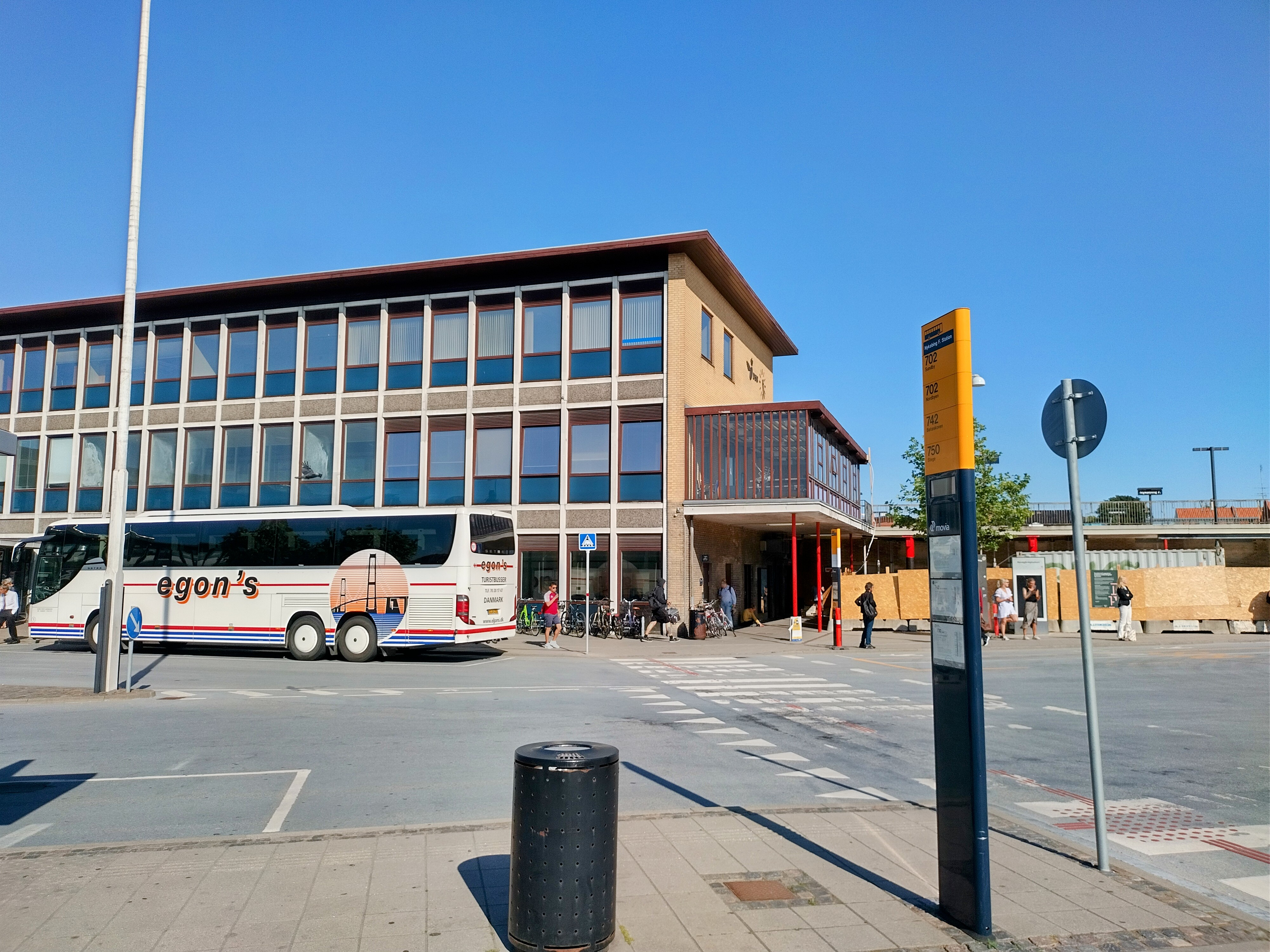
The station building in 2021.

Nykøbing Falster railway station's first station building was built in 1872 to designs by the Danish architect H. C. Scharling.

The first station building was torn down in 1962 to make way for the second and current station building in modernist style that was built in 1962 to designs by the Danish architect Ole Ejnar Bonding in his capacity of head architect of the Danish State Railways from 1958 to 1979. It was inaugurated on 14 May 1963. It is in the same uncompromising modernist architectural style as Bonding's other station buildings in Kalundborg, Skive, Vojens, Brønderslev, Rødekro, Holbæk, Svanemøllen and Herning.

== Station facilities ==
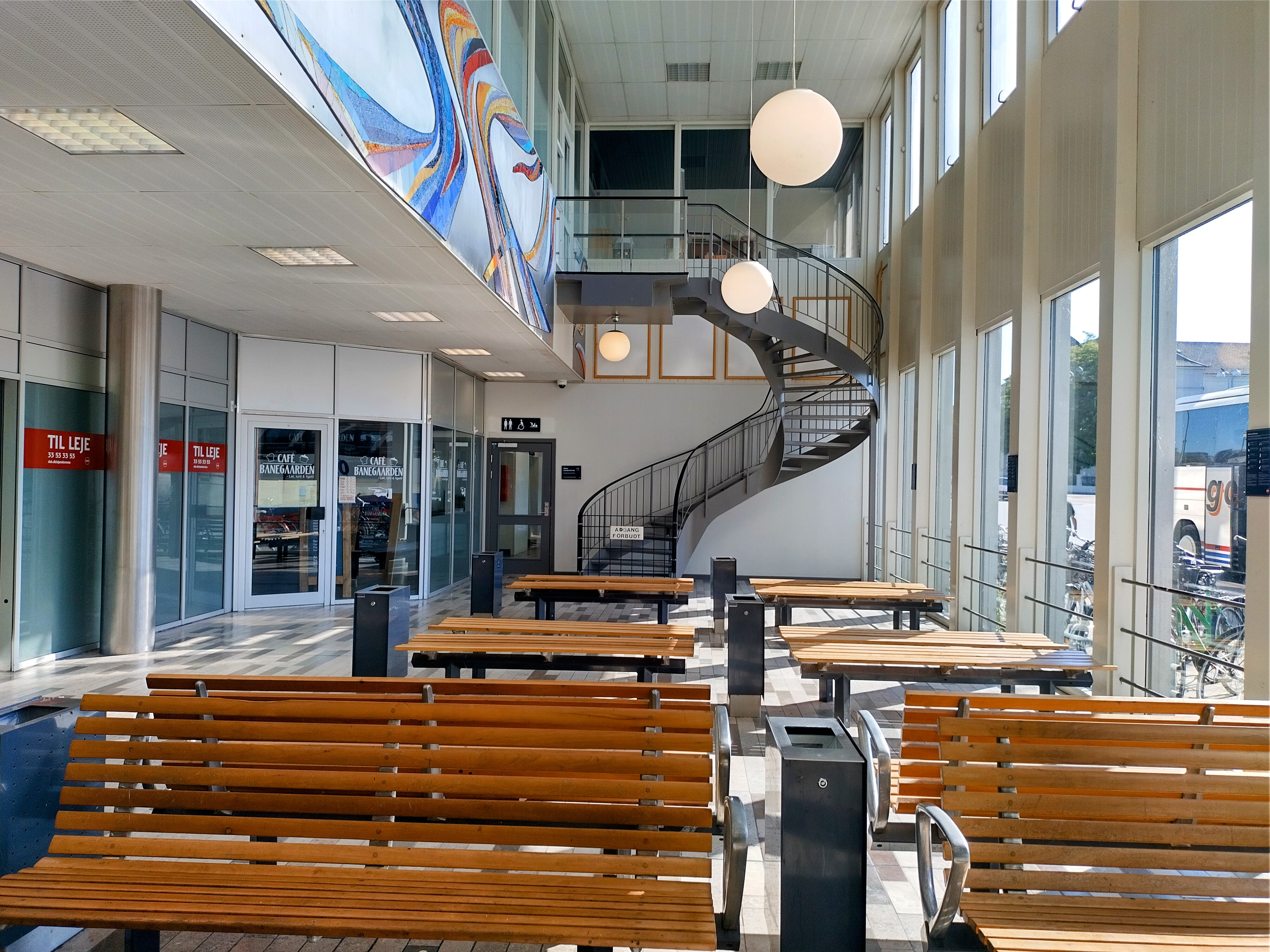
Interior of the station building

Inside the station building there is a combined ticket office and convenience store operated by 7-Eleven, automated ticket machines, waiting room, and toilets.

Adjacent to the station is the Nykøbing Falster bus terminal. The station forecourt has a taxi stand, and the station also has a bicycle parking station as well as a car park with approximately 140 parking spaces.

== See also ==
- Transportation in Denmark
- Rail transport in Denmark
- History of rail transport in Denmark
- List of railway stations in Denmark
- Danish State Railways
- Lokaltog
- Banedanmark
