= Næstved railway station =

Railway station in Næstved Municipality, Denmark

Næstved
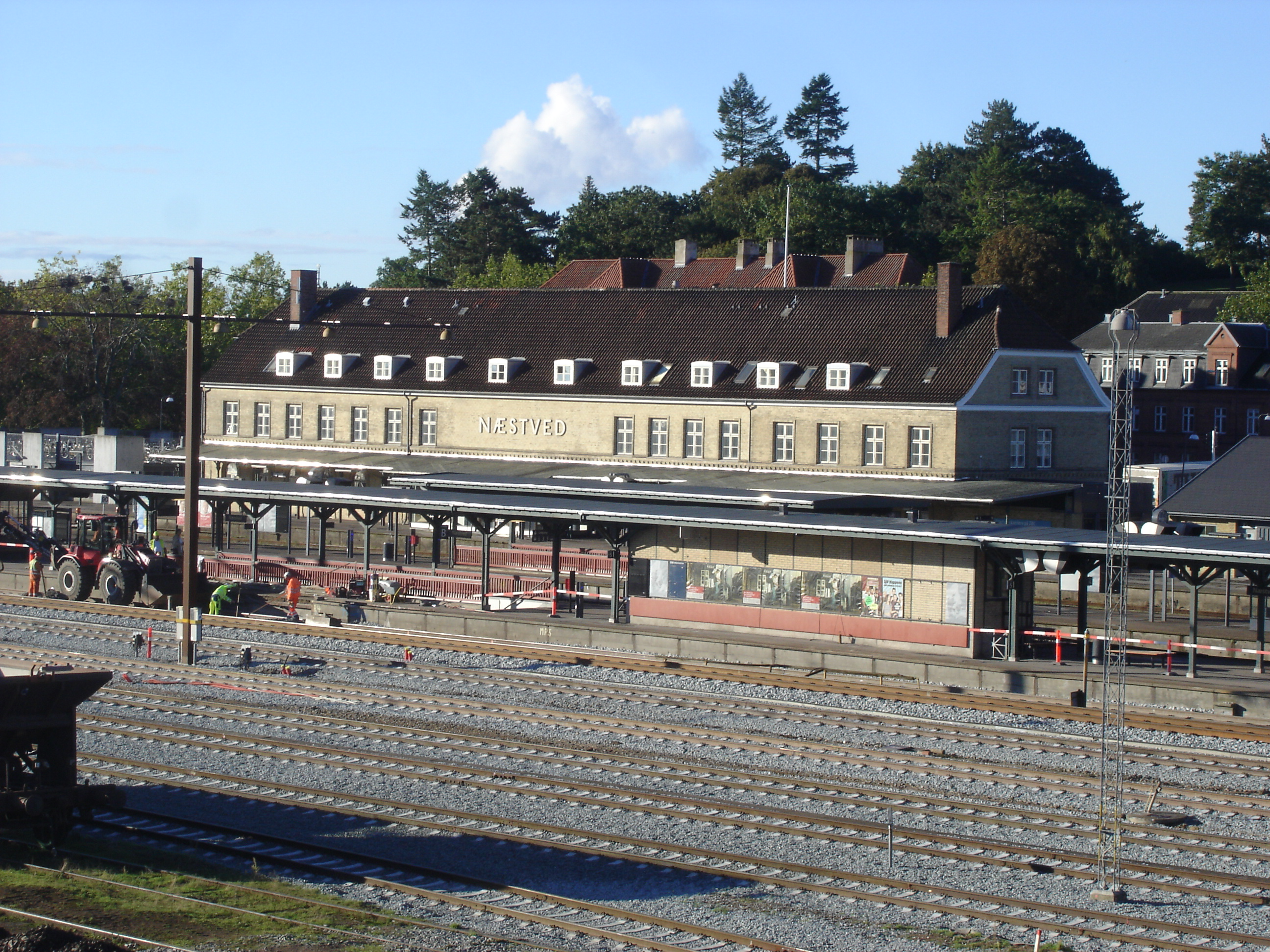
- Næstved station in 2013

General information
- Location: Banegårdspladsen 2; 4700 Næstved; Næstved Municipality; Denmark
- Coordinates: 55°13′54″N 11°46′3″E
- Elevation: 14.1 metres (46 ft)
- Owner: DSB (station infrastructure); Banedanmark (rail infrastructure)
- Lines: South Line; Little South Line; Slagelse–Næstved (closed 1971); Næstved–Præstø–Mern (closed 1961)
- Platforms: 3
- Tracks: 5
- Train operators: DSB

Construction
- Architect: Charles Abrahams (1870); Sigurd Christensen (1921); Knud Tanggaard Seest (1940-43)

History
- Opened: 4 October 1870
- Rebuilt: 1891–1892, 1921, 1940–1943

Services
Preceding station	DSB	Following station
Næstved North towards Østerport	Copenhagen–Køge–Næstved Regional train	Terminus
Ringsted towards Copenhagen Central	Copenhagen–Nykøbing F Regional train	Vordingborg towards Nykøbing F
Glumsø towards Helsingør	Elsinore–Copenhagen– Roskilde–Næstved Regional train	Terminus
Terminus	Næstved–Nykøbing F Regional train	Lundby towards Nykøbing F
Location

Næstved railway station (Danish: Næstved Station or Næstved Banegård) is the main railway station serving the town of Næstved in southern Zealand, Denmark. It is located in the centre of the town, on the eastern edge of the historic town centre, and immediately adjacent to the Næstved bus station.

Næstved station is located on the main line South Line which connects Copenhagen with southern Zealand and the islands of Falster and Lolland. It is also the southern terminus of the Little South branch line from Køge to Næstved. The station opened in 1870, and its current station building designed by the architect Knud Tanggaard Seest was built between 1940 and 1943.

The station offers direct regional train services to Copenhagen and Nykøbing Falster operated by the national railway company DSB.

== History ==
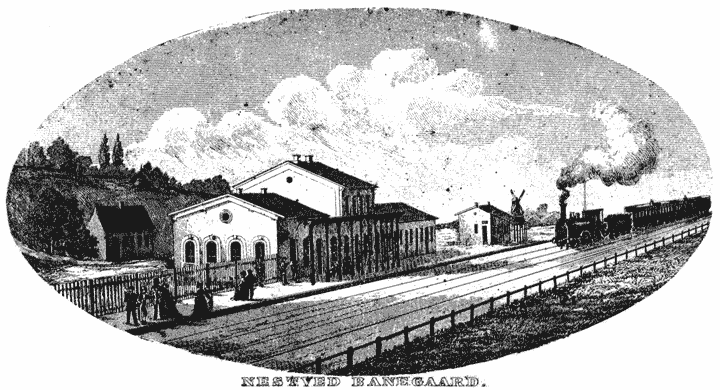
The original Næstved station

Næstved station opened on 4 October 1870 as the Zealand Railway Company (Danish: Det Sjællandske Jernbaneselskab) opened the original Zealand South Line, which connected Copenhagen with South Zealand via Roskilde, Køge and Næstved. In 1880 the railway line was taken over by the Danish state, and in 1885 became part of the national railway company DSB.

== Architecture ==
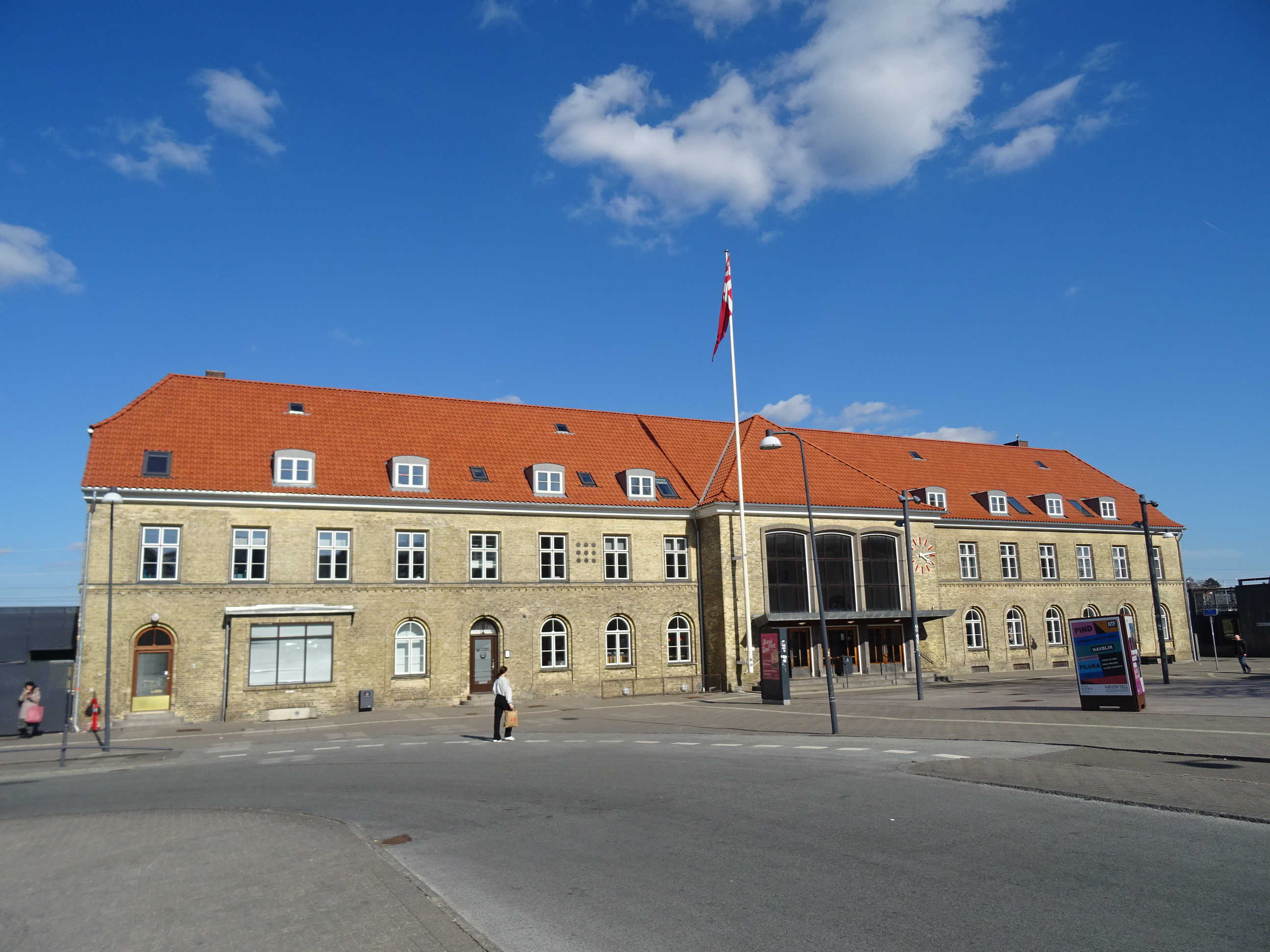
The station building in 2022.

Næstved station's original station building from 1870 was built to designs by the Danish architect Charles Abrahams (1838–1893).

The station building was rebuilt completely from 1940 to 1943 to designs by the Danish architect Knud Tanggaard Seest (1879–1972), known for the numerous railway stations he designed across Denmark in his capacity of head architect of the Danish State Railways.

== Facilities ==
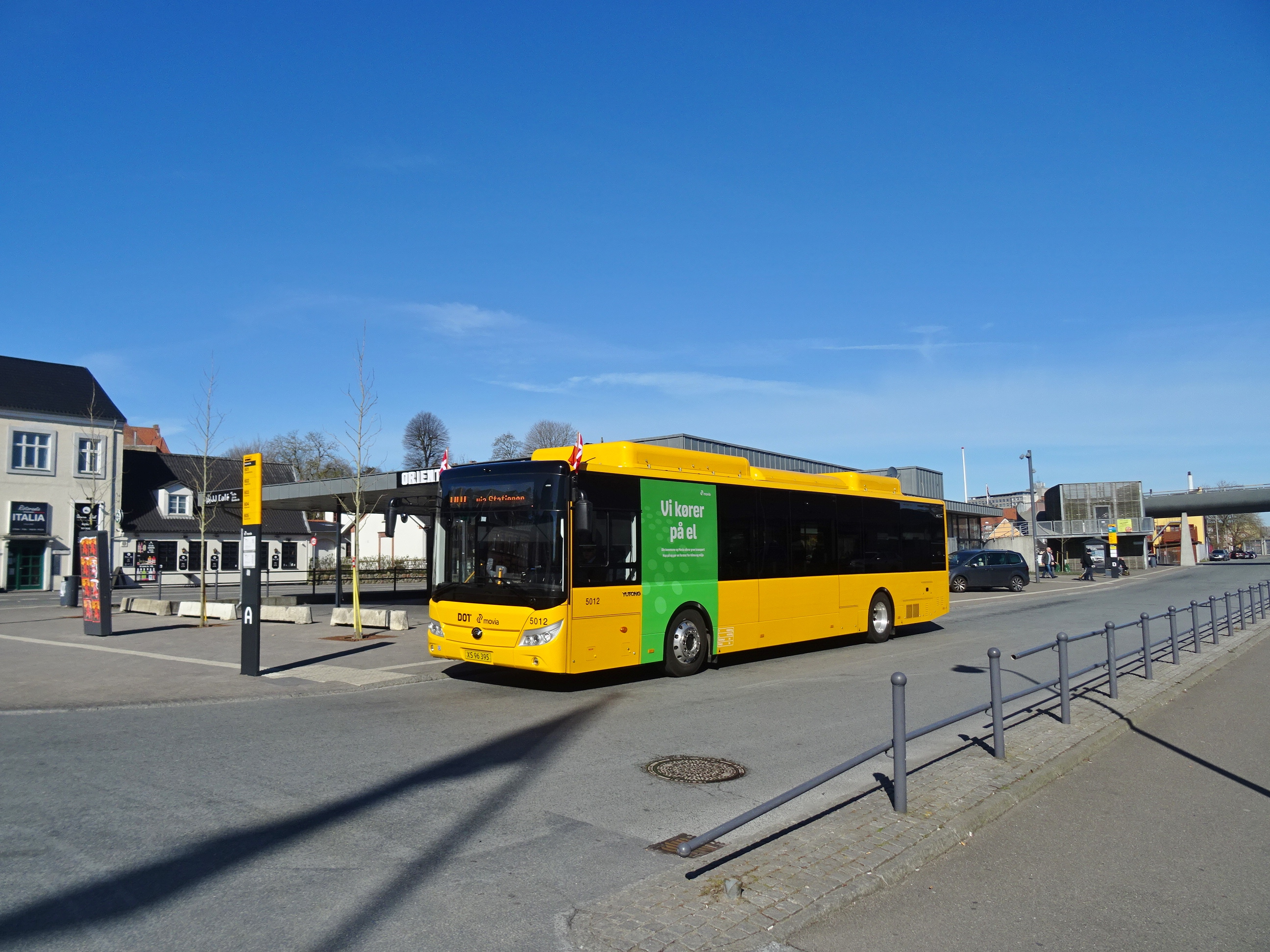
The Næstved bus station.

Inside the station building there is a combined ticket office and convenience store operated by 7-Eleven, ticket machines, waiting room and toilets.

Adjacent to the station is the Næstved bus station. The station forecourt has a taxi stand, and the station also has a bicycle parking station as well as a car park with approximately 407 parking spaces.

== In popular culture ==
In the title sequence of the DR television series En by i provinsen, a train is seen departing from Næstved Station. In the television series, Næstved railway station is used as the location for Sinding Station.

== See also ==
- List of railway stations in Denmark
- Rail transport in Denmark
- History of rail transport in Denmark
