= Charles Abrahams =

Danish architect

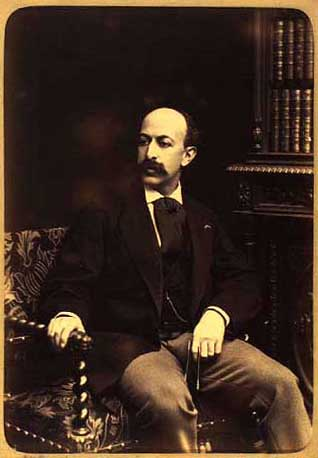
Charles Abrahams

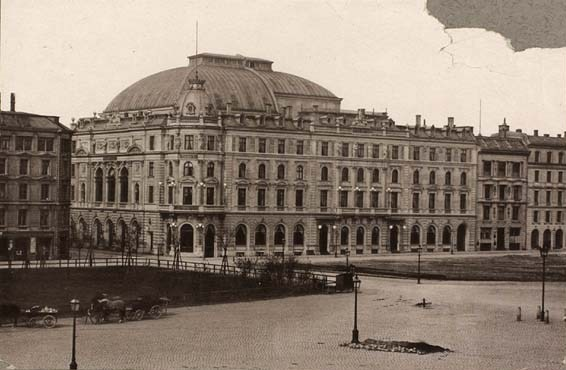
Dagmarteatret

Charles Julius Sophus Abrahams (2 June 1838 – 13 April 1893) was a Danish architect.

== Biography ==
Abrahams was the son of Nicolai Christian Levin Abrahams (1798–1870), a professor at the University of Copenhagen. He was the elder brother of theatre director Severin Abrahams (1843–1900).

He became a student at the Technical University of Denmark (Danmarks Tekniske Universitet) from 1857 and was admitted to the Royal Danish Academy of Fine Arts, School of Architecture (Det Kongelige Danske Kunsakademi) in 1859. He studied under architect Johan Henrik Nebelong and began designing manor houses with French Renaissance influences. He exhibited at Charlottenborg Spring Exhibition in 1864 and 1870. He worked within the framework of Historicism. Among his works were Dagmarteatret (1883) which burnt down in 1937, Næstved Station (1870), which has since rebuilt at least three times, Tureby Station (1870), Absalonsgade 17 (1874) and Krebs School (1878) as well as numerous other buildings.

== Personal life ==
He married Vilhelmine Petersen on 26 October 1877 in Copenhagen.

== See also ==
- List of Danish architects
