= Bistrup, Birkerød =

Suburb in Birkerød, Denmark

Bistrup
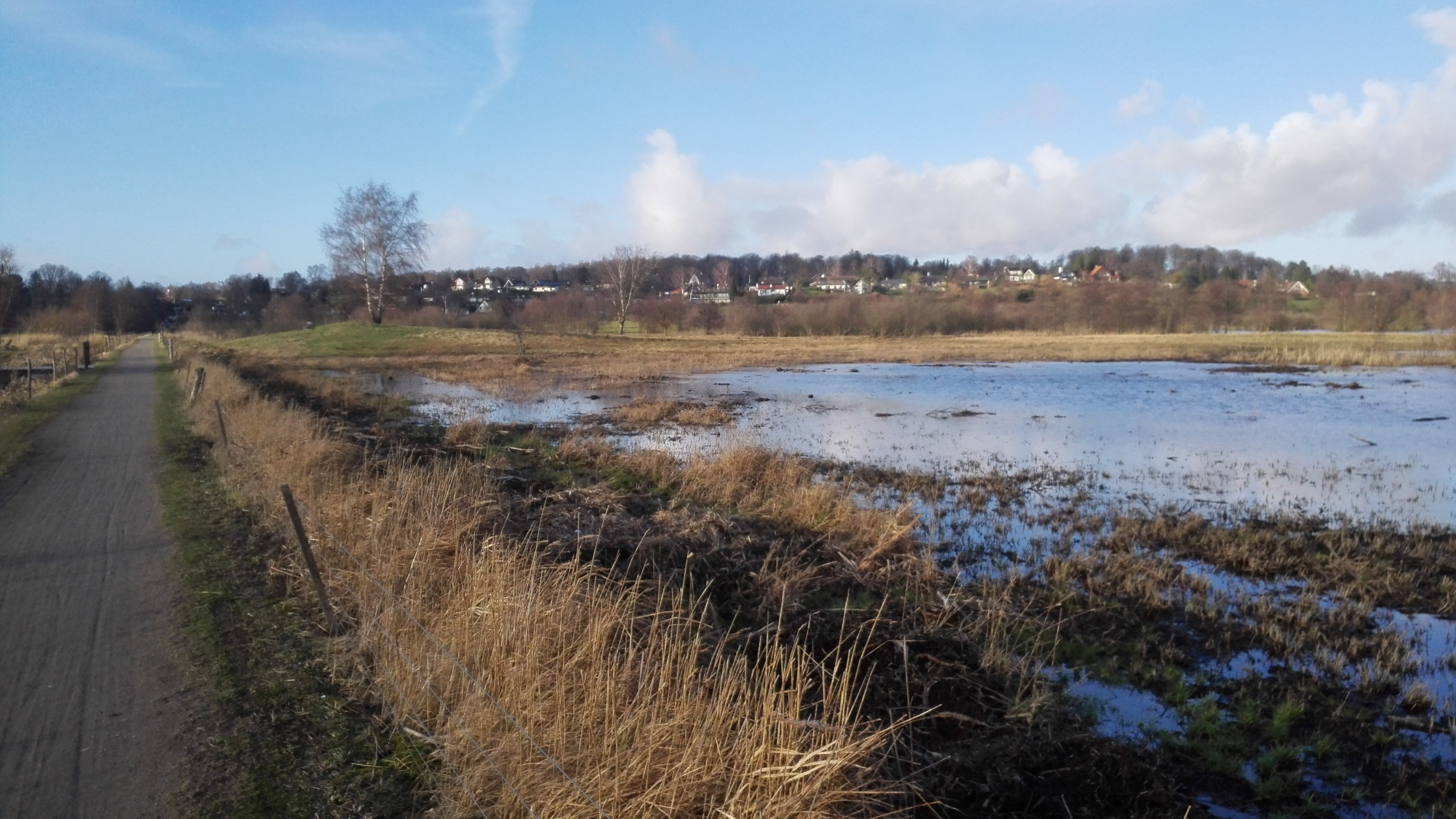

- Location in the Capital Region
- Coordinates: 55°49′27″N 12°25′38″E
- Country: Denmark
- Region: Capital Region
- Municipality: Rudersdal Municipality
- Parish: Bistrup Parish

Population (2011)
  - Total: 20,041
- Time zone: UTC+1 (CET)
  - Summer (DST): UTC+2 (CEST)
- Postal code: 3460 Birkerød

Bistrup is the southern district of Birkerød. The district lies between Furesø and central Birkerød, approximately 20 kilometers from central Copenhagen. Bistrup is part of Rudersdal Municipality and Bistrup Parish. Bistrup Church is located within the district.

== Etymology ==
The first element is derived from "biskorp", and the second element from "-torp", meaning a settlement established by people moving out from another village.

== History ==
In 1682, Bistrup village consisted of 4 farms and 3 houses without land. The total cultivated area amounted to 137.7 Barrels of land, assessed at 36.51 barrels of grain. The method of cultivation was three-field rotation. In 1864, the Nordbanen railway was established with a stop at Birkerød, where a railway town quickly developed. Initially, Bistrup was not affected by the railway, but as suburban development around Greater Copenhagen progressed, Bistrup was gradually incorporated. The old village fields were subdivided into villa plots, and Bistrup and Birkerød eventually merged into a continuous urban settlement.

== Literature ==
- Karl-Erik Frandsen: Vang og tægt. Studier over dyrkningssystemer og agrarstrukturer i Danmarks landsbyer 1682-83 (Bygd 1983), ISBN 87-87293-25-0
- Kristian Hald: Vore Stednavne; Udgivet af Udvalget for Folkeoplysningens Fremme. C. E. Gads Forlag, København 1950.
- Henrik Pedersen: De danske Landbrug fremstillet paa Grundlag af Forarbejderne til Christian V.s Matrikel 1688. Udgivet efter hans Død paa Bekostning af Carlsbergfondet (København MCMXXVIII; Reprotryk for Landbohistorisk Selskab, København 1975), ISBN 87-7526-056-5
