= Allerød =

Allerød may refer to:

- Allerød Municipality, a municipality in Denmark
  - Lillerød, also called Allerød, seat of the municipality
  - Allerød station, a railway station in the Danish town
- Allerød oscillation, a climatic period at the end of the last glaciation
- Allerød FK, a football club in Lillerød
