= Gentofte railway station =

Railway station in Greater Copenhagen, Denmark

Gentofte
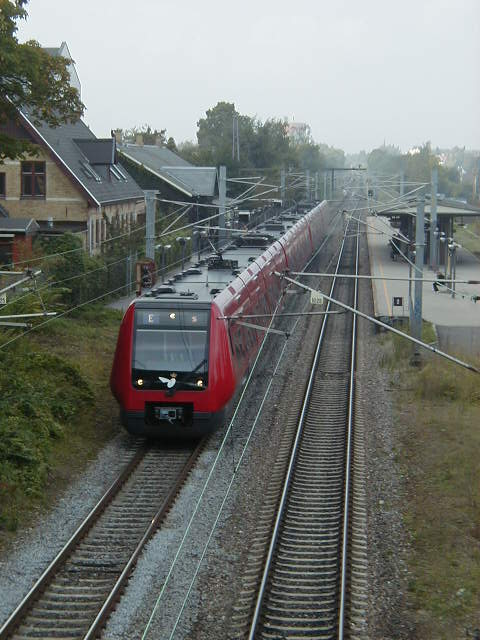
- Gentofte station in 2001

General information
- Location: Brogårdsvej 14; 2820 Gentofte; Gentofte Municipality; Denmark
- Coordinates: 55°45′13″N 12°32′29″E
- Elevation: 24.8 metres (81 ft)
- Owner: DSB (station infrastructure); Banedanmark (rail infrastructure)
- Line: North Line
- Platforms: Side platforms
- Tracks: 2
- Train operators: DSB

Other information
- Website: Official website

History
- Opened: 1863

Services
Preceding station	S-train	Following station
Jægersborg towards Holte	E Mon–Fri	Bernstorffsvej towards Køge
Jægersborg towards Hillerød	A Sat–Sun	Bernstorffsvej towards Køge
Location

Gentofte station is a suburban railway station serving the suburb of Gentofte in the northern suburbs of Copenhagen, Denmark. The station is located on the Hillerød radial of Copenhagen's S-train network, served by E-trains to Hillerød/Holte and Copenhagen.

The station was the site of the 1897 Gentofte train crash.

== See also ==
- List of Copenhagen S-train stations
- List of railway stations in Denmark
