= Bernstorffsvej railway station =

Railway station in Greater Copenhagen, Denmark

Bernstorffsvej
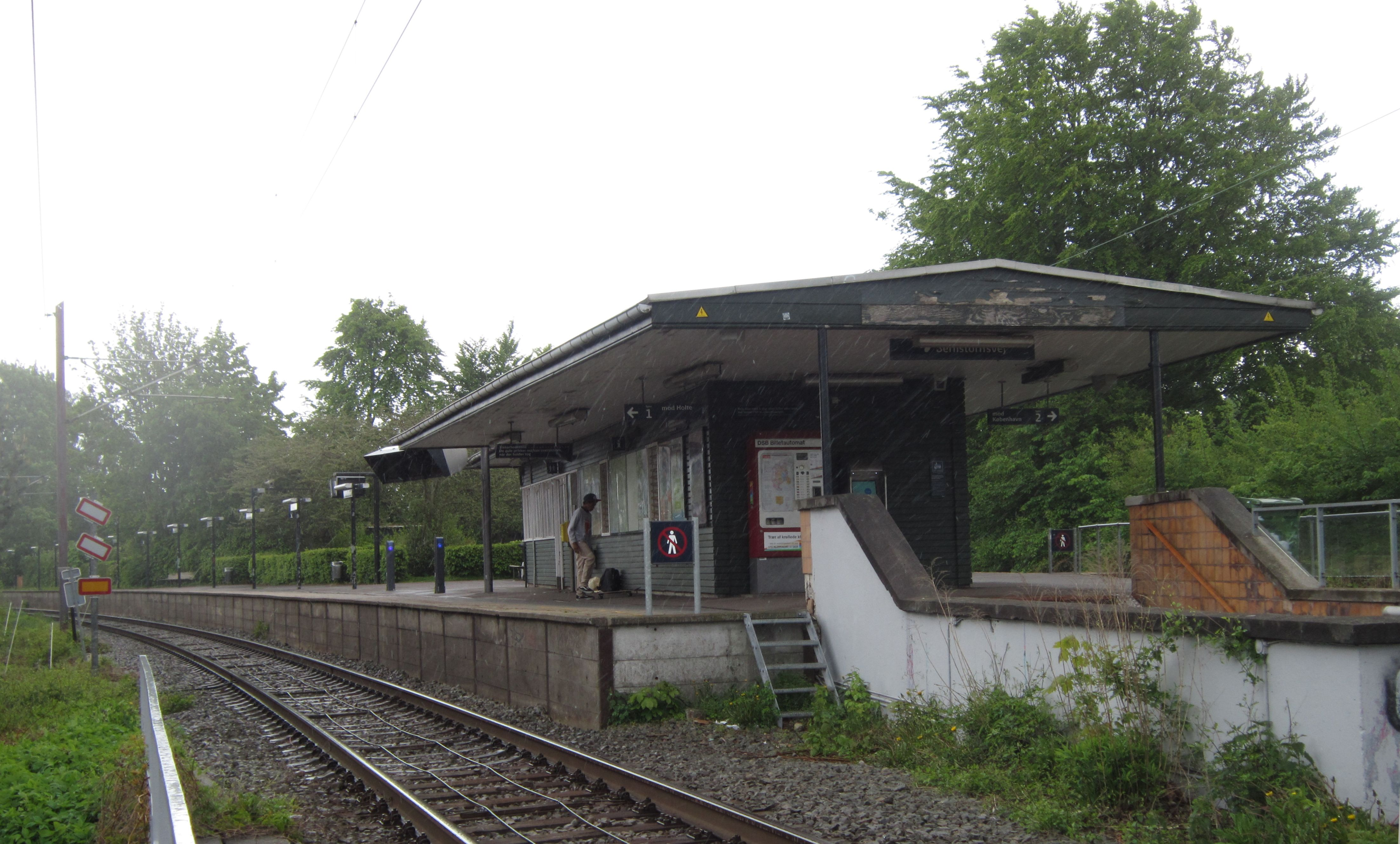
- Bernstorffsvej station in 2012

General information
- Location: Bernstorffsvej 134; 2900 Hellerup; Gentofte Municipality; Denmark
- Coordinates: 55.7435°N 12.557°E
- Elevation: 12.9 metres (42 ft)
- Owner: DSB (station infrastructure); Banedanmark (rail infrastructure)
- Line: North Line
- Platforms: Island platform
- Tracks: 2
- Train operators: DSB

Construction
- Architect: Knud Tanggaard Seest

Other information
- Website: Official website

History
- Opened: 1936

Services
Preceding station	S-train	Following station
Gentofte towards Holte	E Mon–Fri	Hellerup towards Køge
Gentofte towards Hillerød	A Sat–Sun	Hellerup towards Køge
Location

Bernstorffsvej station is a suburban rail railway station serving the northeastern part of the district of Hellerup in Gentofte Municipality in the northern suburbs of Copenhagen, Denmark. The station is located where the railway line crosses the major road Bernstorffsvej after which it is named.

The station is located on the Hillerød branch of the S-train network in Copenhagen, Denmark, served by the E-line between Køge station and Holte station while the longer A-line doesn't stop at this station between Monday and Friday. The station is served every 10th minute in each direction. The station was opened on 15 May 1936, together with the S-train line Hellerup-Holte. It has altered very little since, except for the addition of a lift and a viaduct across Bernstorffsvej, which was rebuilt in 1969. The station is in need of renovation and has been unstaffed for many years. Tickets can be purchased from an automat or via SMS/internet.

== Cultural references ==
Bernstorffsvej station is used as a location in the 1961 Danish comedy film Støv på hjernen.

== See also ==
- List of Copenhagen S-train stations
- List of railway stations in Denmark
