= Birkerød =

Town in Capital Region, Denmark

- Town
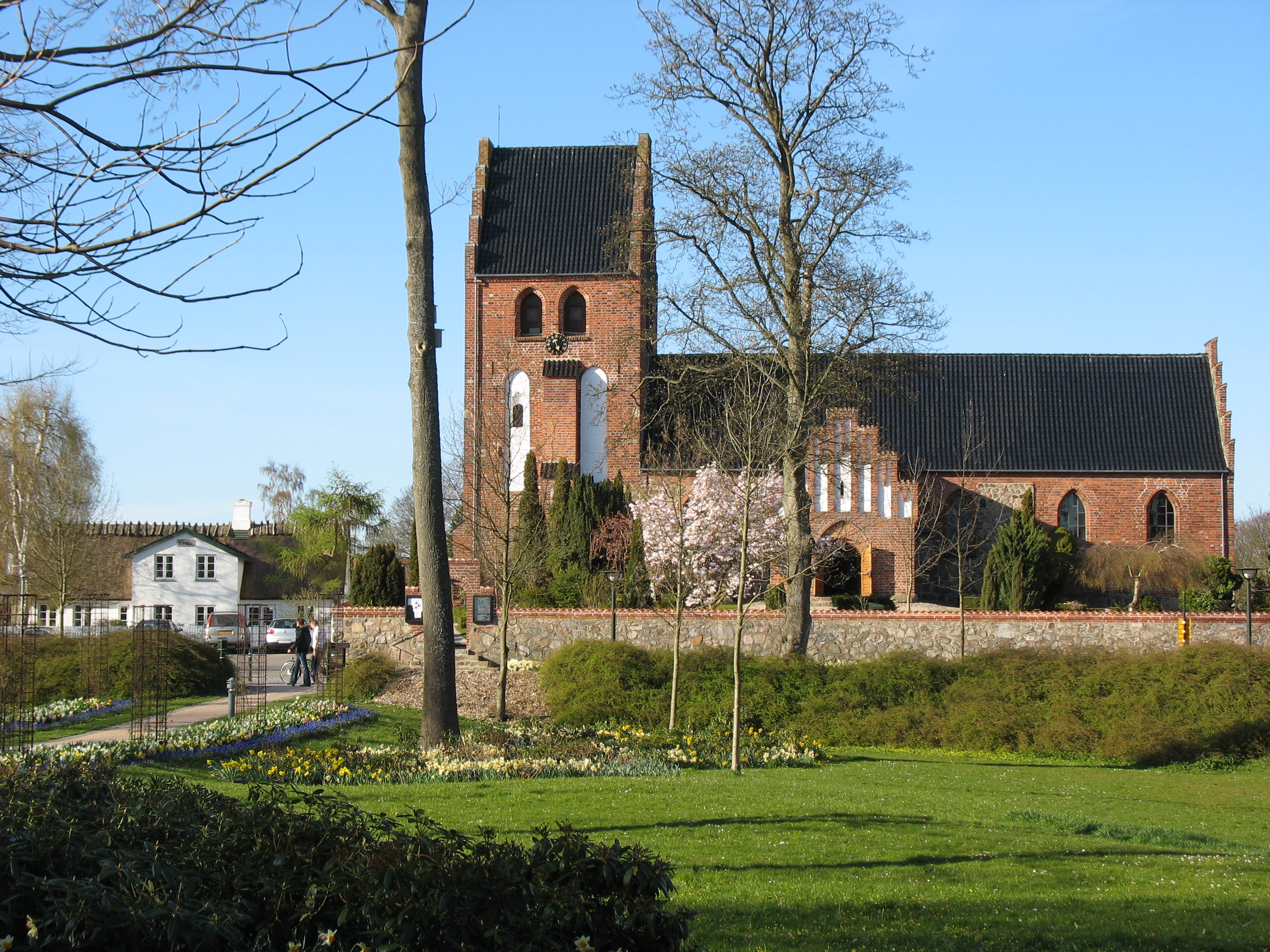
- Birkerød Church

- Location in Denmark Birkerød (Capital Region)
- Coordinates: 55°50′20″N 12°25′48″E
- Country: Denmark
- Region: Capital (Hovedstaden)
- Municipality: Rudersdal

Area
  - Urban: 9.12 km^{2} (3.52 sq mi)
- Elevation: 50 m (160 ft)

Population (2026)
  - Urban: 21,242
  - Urban density: 2,330/km^{2} (6,030/sq mi)
  - Gender: 10,412 males and 10,830 females
- Time zone: UTC+1 (CET)
  - Summer (DST): UTC+2 (CEST)
- Postal code: 3460 Birkerød
- Area code: (+45) 48
- Website: rudersdal.dk/english

Birkerød (Danish: [ˈpiɐ̯kəˌʁøˀð]) is a town in Rudersdal Municipality in the northern outskirts of Copenhagen, Denmark. It is surrounded by several lakes and small woodlands. Birkerød station is located on the Hillerød radial of the S-train suburban network.

== History ==
The parish of Birkerød contained the villages Birkerød, Kajerød, Bistrup, Ravnsnæs, Isterød, Høsterkøb, Sandbjerg and Ubberød.

Birkerød became a railway town in 1868, when the Nordbanen railway opened a station here between Lyngby and Helsingør. This led to new growth and several brickyards opened in the area in the second half of the 19th century. The rail line between Copenhagen and Hillerød was later converted to an S-train suburban line and construction of new residential neighbourhoods accelerated in the 1940s which, in time, made Birkerød merge with Bistrup to the south, Kajerød to the west and Ravnsnæs to the east.

Until 2007, Birkerød was its own municipality, known as Birkerød Municipality. This changed with the Strukturreformen.

== Geography ==
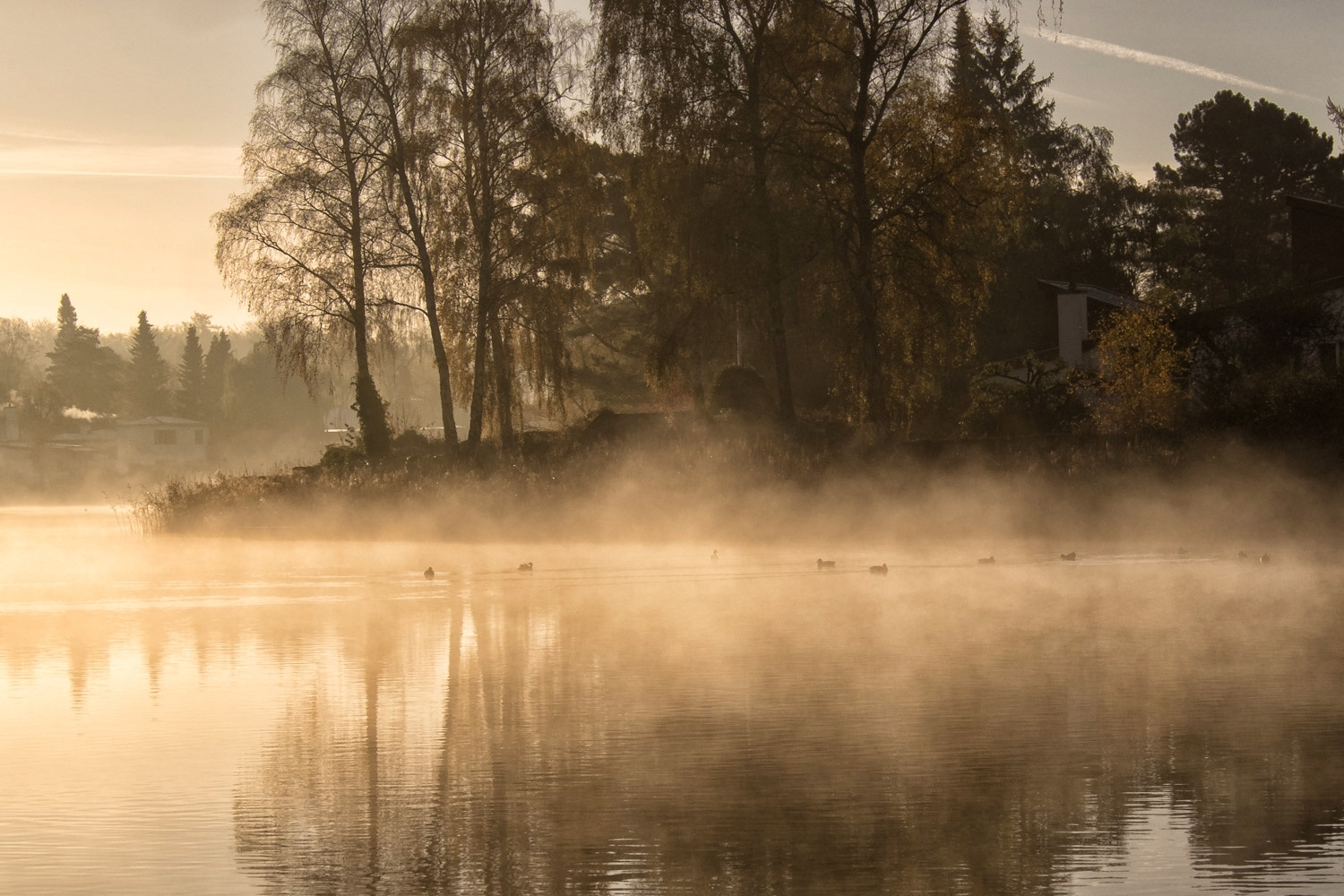
Birkerød Lake

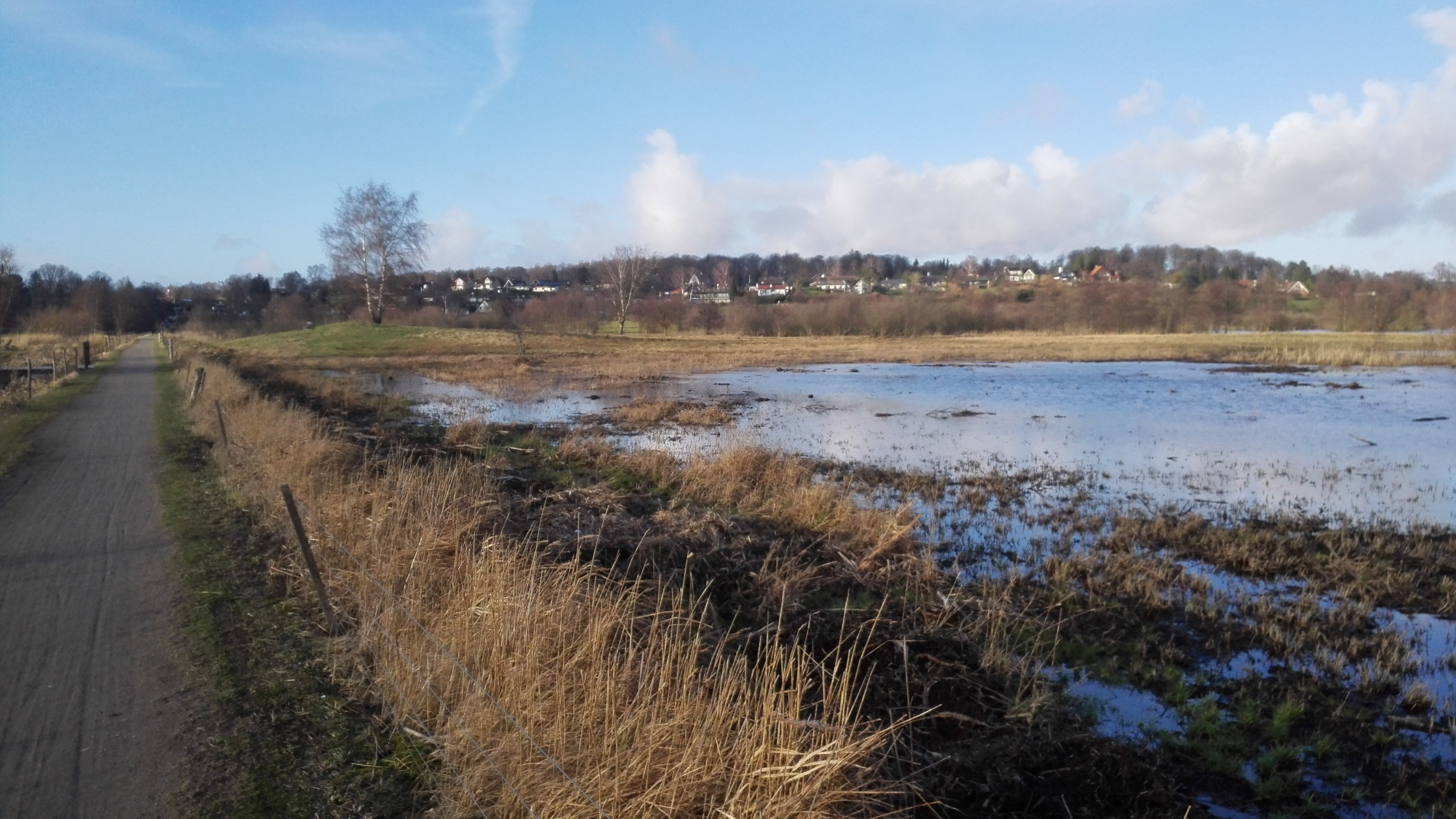
View on the Bistrup neighbourhood from Vaserne

Birkerød is bordered by 941-hectare Lake Furesø to the south and Lake Sjælsø to the north. The smaller Birkerød Lake is located just south of the railway station in the town centre. The approximately 86 hectares wetland Vaserne (in Danish) along the northeastern shores of Lake Furesø and the western part of Frederikslund Forest separate Birkerød (Bistrup) from Holte to the southeast. Bistrup Hegn is situated between Bistrup to the south and Birkerød to the north. Rude Forest is located to the east of Birkerød. Eskemose Forest at Lake Sjælsø, north of Kajerød, is the site of several natural springs.

== Townscape ==
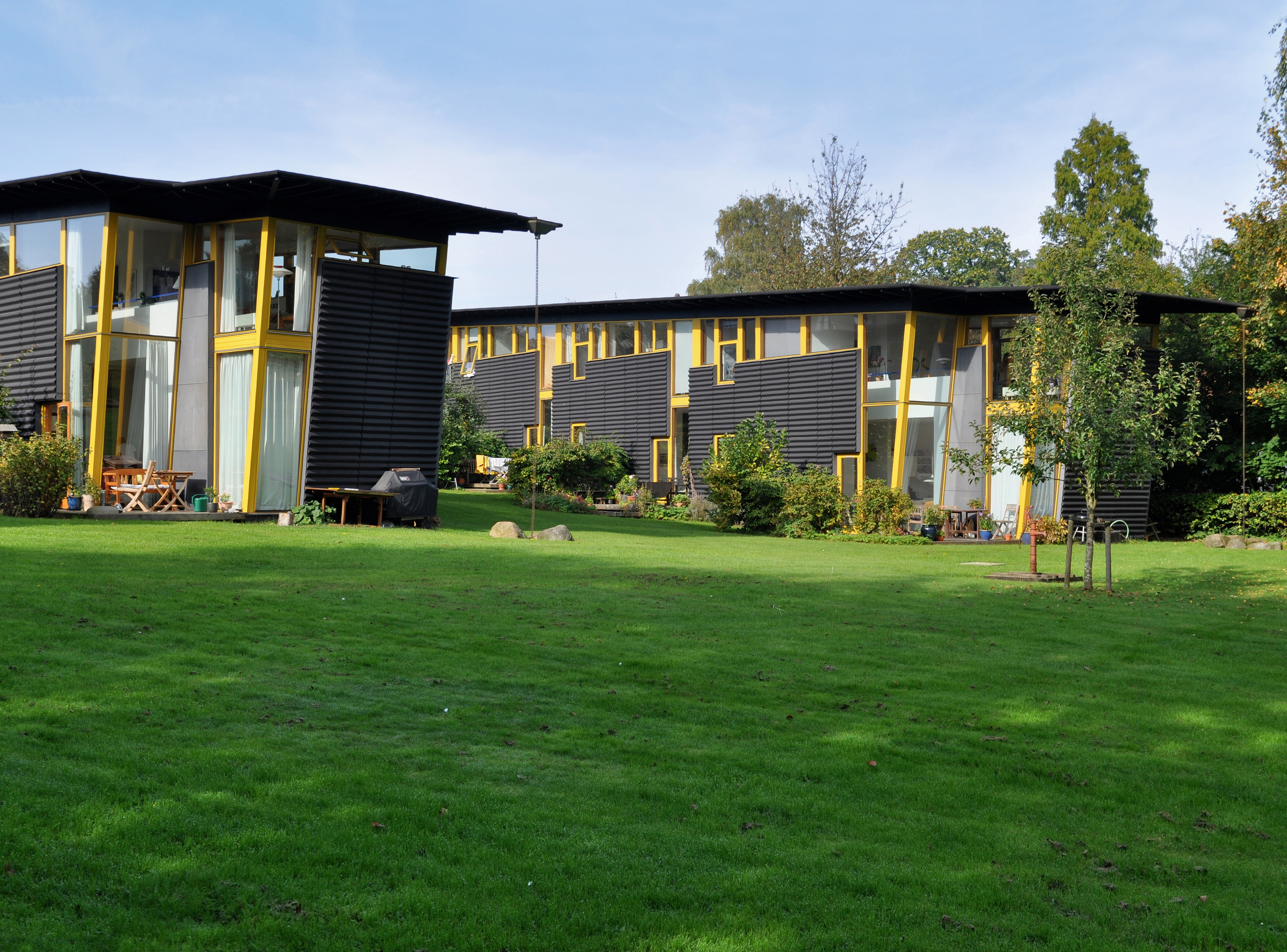
Bikerød Søhuse

Birkerød consists mainly of single family detached homes.

Tegnestuen Vandkunsten has designed a number of housing estates. Trudeslund (1980-81) is a co-housing community. The concept was later developed further with Jystrup Savværk in Jystrup. The Langkjærgård development is from 1985 and Blikfanget was built in 1988-1989. Søhuse (1995), a development of terraced housing, is located on a gently sloping site on the banks of Birkerød Lake.

== Culture and sports ==
Mantziusgården, the former state school, is now used as a local cultural centre. Activities include art exhibitions, concerts, theatre and stand-up comedy. The premises also comprise four open workshops with facilities for making graphic art, glass art, ceramics and weaving. Other cultural Institutions includes Birkerød Library and the Local Historic Archives.

Birkerød Sports and Leisure Centre was built in 2007 and is located next to the indoor swimming hall and football pitches, both of which was renovated simultaneously. The new centre was designed by Schmidt Hammer Lassen and is used for a wide variety of activities, including team handball fitness and yoga as well as concerts and other cultural events.

The local football club of IF Skjold Birkerød was founded in 1917, and currently plays the Danish 2nd Division East. Furesø Golf Club is based at Hestkøbgård in the western part of Birkerød. The club was established in 1974.

== Education ==
Birkerød Gymnasium was founded as a private boys' school in 1868. In 2007 it changed name to Birkerød Gymnasium, HF, IB og Kostskole (Birkerød Gymnasium, HF, IB & Boarding School). The name change is due to the additional education types added since the foundation of the school. The school has over 1000 students, 300 of those being International Baccalaureate (IB) candidates. It is currently the biggest public IB school in Denmark. There is also a boarding school with about 70 students living on campus. Most of these students have been expats earlier in their life and might still have family members living as expats around the world.

Since 2011, a Model UN at has been taking place annually at Birkerød Gymnasium. It is called BIGMUN (Birkerød Gymnasium Model United Nations) and it has attracted several hundreds of high-school students from around the world to debate as in the . At BIGMUN 2019, approximately 370 students from 33 different schools around the world participated. These countries include: United States, Israel, Germany, Spain and more.

== Buildings of worship ==
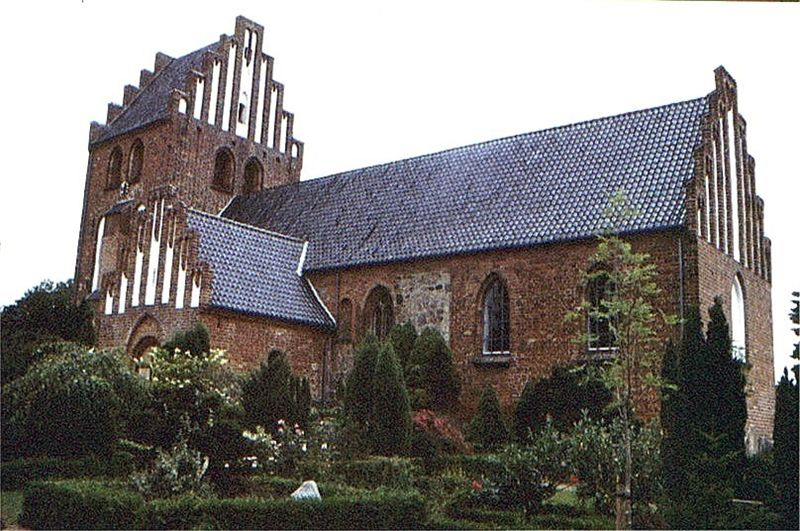
Birkerød Church

Birkerød Church is a traditional Danish parish church whose oldest parts date from the late 12th and early 13th century. The tower was built in the late 15th century, the current chancel in about 1500 and the porch in 1525. The Parish of Bistrup was disjoined from that of Birkerød in 1963 and its church was inaugurated in 1967.

The property Nordvanggård housed a congregation of Sisters of the Precious Blood from the late 1950s until 2015. The Sisters belong to the German Province, the provincial house is in Neuenbeken near Paderborn. They also have a convent in Rønne on the island of Bornholm. The building is now owned by Rudersdal Municipality and is temporarily used to house refugees.

== Transport ==
=== Rail ===
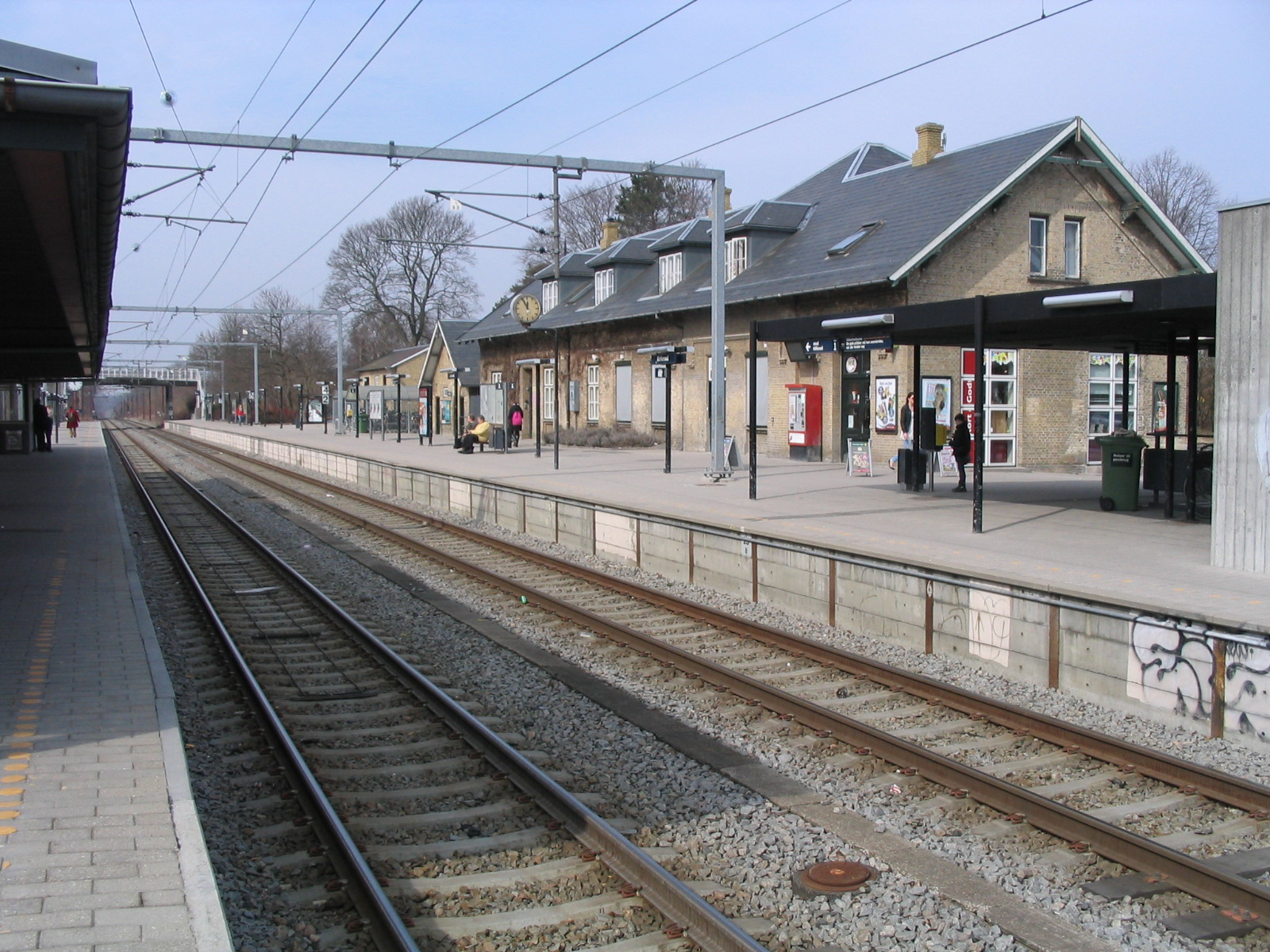
Birkerød railway station

Birkerød is served by Birkerød railway station which is located on the Hillerød radial of Copenhagen's S-train network. The station is served regularly by trains on the A-line which have a journey time to central Copenhagen of around 20 minutes.

=== Road ===
Lyngby Kongevej bisects Birkerød on its way from Copenhagen to Hillerød. The Hillerød Motorway passed Birkerød to the west and the Helsingør Motorway passes Birkerød to the east.

=== Bus ===
From Birkerød station:

- 196: to Kajerød (Birkerød north)
- 197: to Holte Station
- 198: to Bistrup
- 199: to Birkerød west/industrial zone
- 500S: Ørestad station - Ballerup station - Birkerød station - Kokkedal station

From Bistrup:

- 334: Stenløse station - Farum station - Bistrup - Holte station

== Notable people ==
=== Businesspeople ===
- Povl Badstuber (1685 – 1762 in Birkerød), coppersmith and manufacturer

=== Culture ===
- Aage Bertelsen (1873 – 1945 in Birkerød), landscape painter], lived in Birkerød
- Axel Borup-Jørgensen (1924 – 2012 in Birkerød), composer
- Birgitte Hjort Sørensen (born 1982), actress, was. raised in Birkerød
- Hella Joof (born 1962 in Birkerød), actress and director, was born in Birkerød
- Tina Kiberg (born 1958), operatic soprano, grew up in Birkerød
- Rasmus Kofoed (born 1974 in Birkerød), chef and restaurateur, was born in Birkerød
- Carl Edvard Sonne (1794–1878), printmaker, was born in Birkerød
- Jørgen Sonne (1801 in Birkerød – 1890), born and raised in Birkerød

=== Politics ===
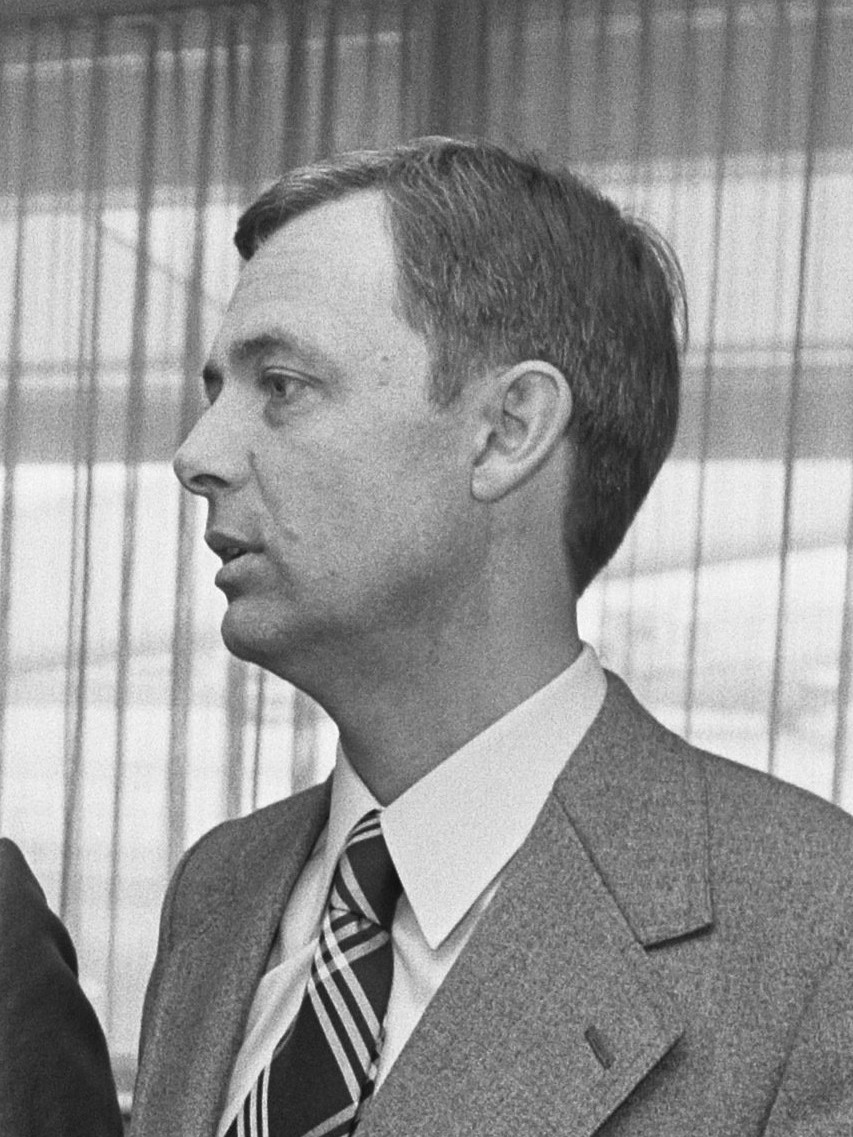
Erling Brøndum, 1974

- Thorkil Kristensen (1899 – 1989 in Birkerød), politician
- Flemming Kofod-Svendsen (born 1944)., politician, lives in Birkerød
- Erling Brøndum (1930–2017 in Birkerød), politician, lived in Birkerød
- Sophie Løhde (born 1983) a Danish politician and Govt. Minister

=== Sport ===
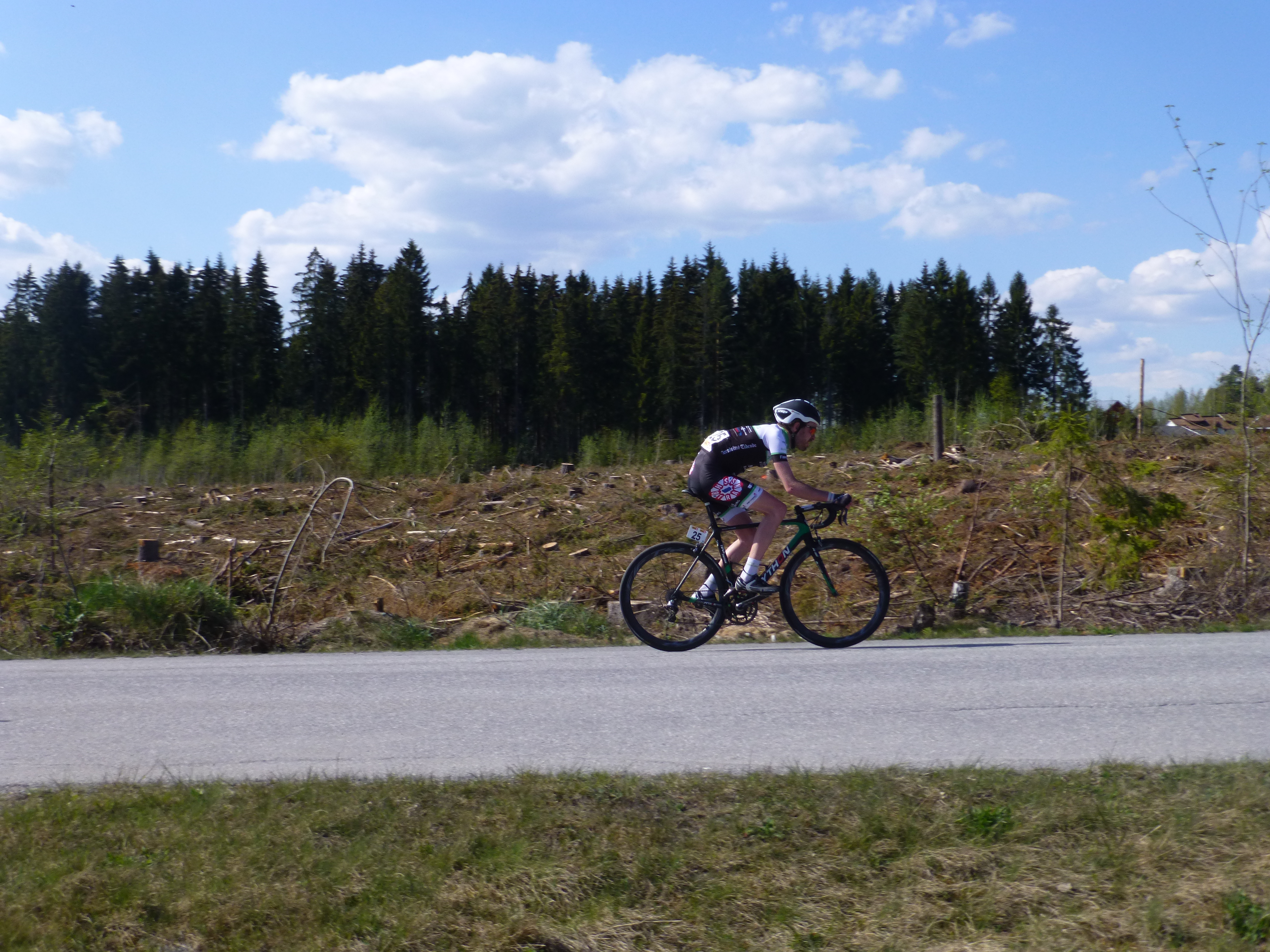
Martin Toft Madsen, 2016

- Kai Jensen (1897 – 1997 in Birkerød) an athlete who competed at the 1924 Summer Olympics
- Bjarne Sørensen (born 1954 in Birkerød) a Danish former cyclist, competed at the 1976 and 1980 Summer Olympics
- Ditte Jensen (born 1980 in Birkerød) swimmer, competed in the 1996 Summer Olympics
- Mathias Tauber (born 1984 in Birkerød) a retired Danish footballer with 325 club caps
- Julie Hjorth-Hansen (born 1984 in Birkerød) swimmer, competed in 2008 Summer Olympics
- Martin Toft Madsen (born 1985 in Birkerød) a Danish cyclist
- Patrick Russell (born 1993 in Birkerød) a Danish professional ice hockey forward
- Anton Ipsen (born 1994) a Danish swimmer, participated in 2016 Summer Olympics
- Mathias Kvistgaarden (born 2002) a Danish footballer, who plays for Brøndby IF

=== Other ===
- Martin Ågerup (1966 in Birkerød) an economist, president of think tank CEPOS

== Twinnings ==
- - Garðabær, Iceland
- - Tórshavn, Faroe Islands

== Sources ==
- Municipal statistics: NetBorger Kommunefakta, delivered from KMD aka Kommunedata (Municipal Data)
- Municipal mergers and neighbors: Eniro new municipalities map
- Bus data: Køreplaner bus
