= 1897 Gentofte train crash =

Coordinates: 55°45′13″N 12°32′29″E

Gentofte train crash
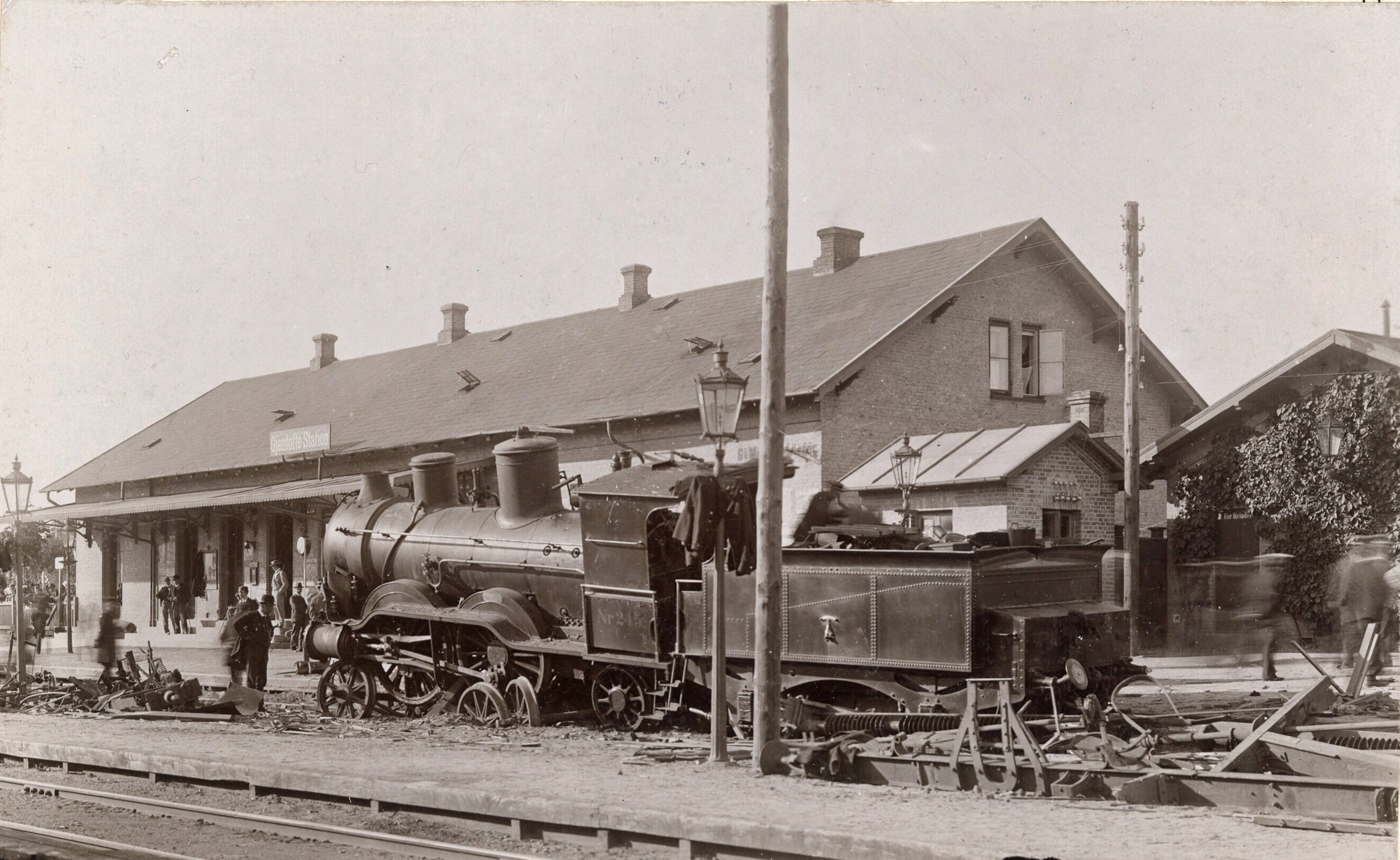
- Gentofte train crash, 11 July 1897

Details
- Date: 11 July 1897
- Country: Denmark
- Incident type: Collision
- Cause: Signal passed at danger

Statistics
- Trains: 2
- Deaths: 40
- Injured: 100+

In the Gentofte train crash at Gentofte station, Denmark, on the island of Zealand, on 11 July 1897 an express train pulled by a DSB class CS (0-4-2) number 245 passed a signal cautioning danger and collided with a stationary passenger train waiting at the station. There were 40 deaths and more than 100 people were injured.
