= Favrholm railway station =

Railway station in Hillerød, Denmark

Favrholm
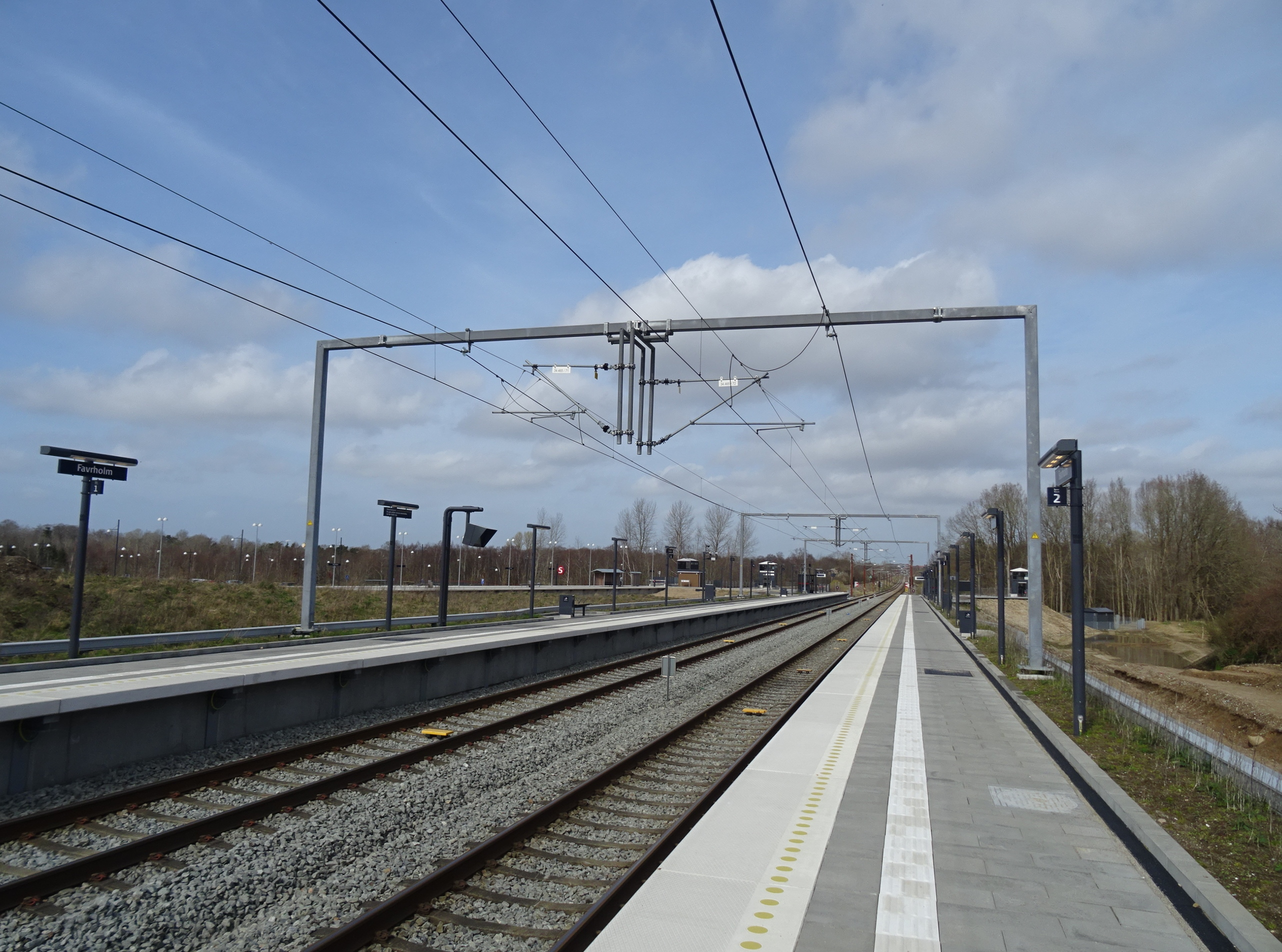

General information
- Location: 3400 Hillerød; Hillerød Municipality; Denmark
- Coordinates: 55°54′40″N 12°18′52″E
- Elevation: 30.0 metres (98.4 ft)
- Owner: DSB (station infrastructure); Banedanmark (rail infrastructure); Lokaltog
- Lines: North Line; Frederiksværk Line
- Platforms: 3
- Tracks: 4
- Train operators: DSB; Lokaltog

History
- Opened: 10 December 2023

Services
Preceding station	S-train	Following station
Hillerød Terminus	A	Allerød towards Hundige
Hillerød Terminus	A Sat–Sun	Allerød towards Køge
Preceding station	Lokaltog	Following station
Hillerød Terminus	Frederiksværk Line Local train	Brødeskov towards Hundested Harbour
Location

Favrholm station is a railway station in the southern part of the town of Hillerød in North Zealand, Denmark. The station serves the new city district of Favrholm and will serve the coming North Zealand Hospital which is expected to open in 2026.

The station opened in 2023. It is located on the Hillerød radial of Copenhagen's S-train network and the Frederiksværk Line between Hillerød and Hundested.

== See also ==
- List of Copenhagen S-train stations
- List of railway stations in Denmark
