= Birkerød railway station =

Railway station in Rudersdal Municipality, Denmark

Birkerød
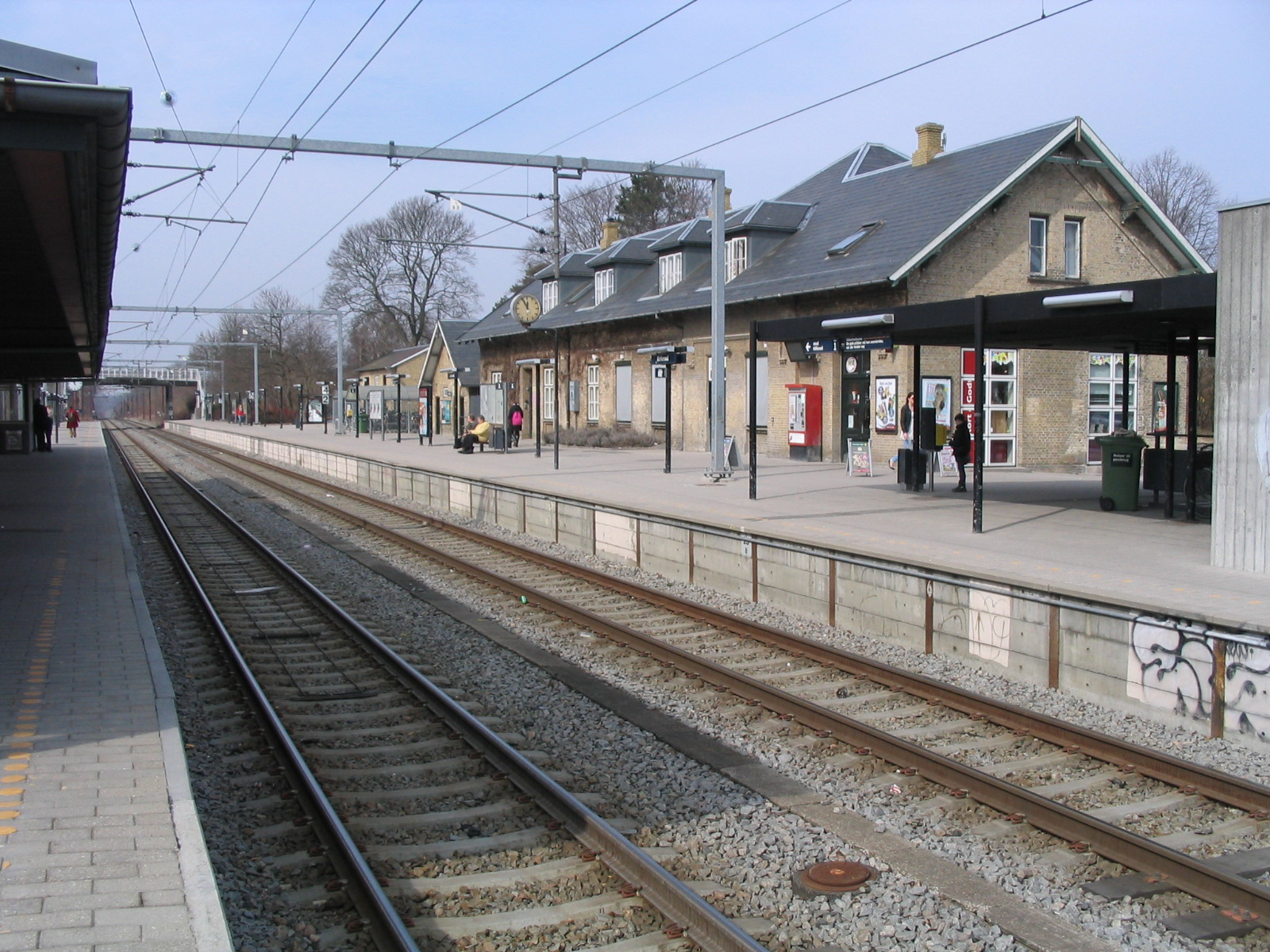
- Birkerød station in 2010

General information
- Location: Stationsvej 5; 3460 Birkerød; Rudersdal Municipality; Denmark
- Coordinates: 55°50′25″N 12°25′26″E
- Elevation: 52.2 metres (171 ft)
- Owner: DSB (station infrastructure); Banedanmark (rail infrastructure)
- Line: North Line
- Platforms: 1 side platform 1 island platform
- Tracks: 3
- Train operators: DSB
- Connections: Bus

Construction
- Architect: Vilhelm Carl Heinrich Wolf

Other information
- Station code: Bi
- Website: Official website

History
- Opened: 1864
- Rebuilt: 26 May 1968 (S-train)
- Electrified: 26 May 1968

Services
Preceding station	S-train	Following station
Høvelte towards Hillerød	A	Holte towards Hundige
Høvelte towards Hillerød	A Sat–Sun	Holte towards Køge
Location

Birkerød station is an S-train railway station serving the satellite town of Birkerød north of Copenhagen, Denmark. The station is located in the centre of the town, a short distance from Birkerød Church and Birkerød Lake.

Birkerød station is located on the Hillerød radial of Copenhagen's S-train network, a hybrid suburban rail and rapid transit system serving Greater Copenhagen. It is served regularly by trains on the A-line which have a journey time to central Copenhagen of around 20 minutes.

The station opened in 1864 with the opening of the North Line between Copenhagen and Helsingør via Hillerød, and has been served by the S-train network since 1968. The original station building from 1864 was built to designs by the Danish architect Vilhelm Carl Heinrich Wolf (1833–1893).

== History ==
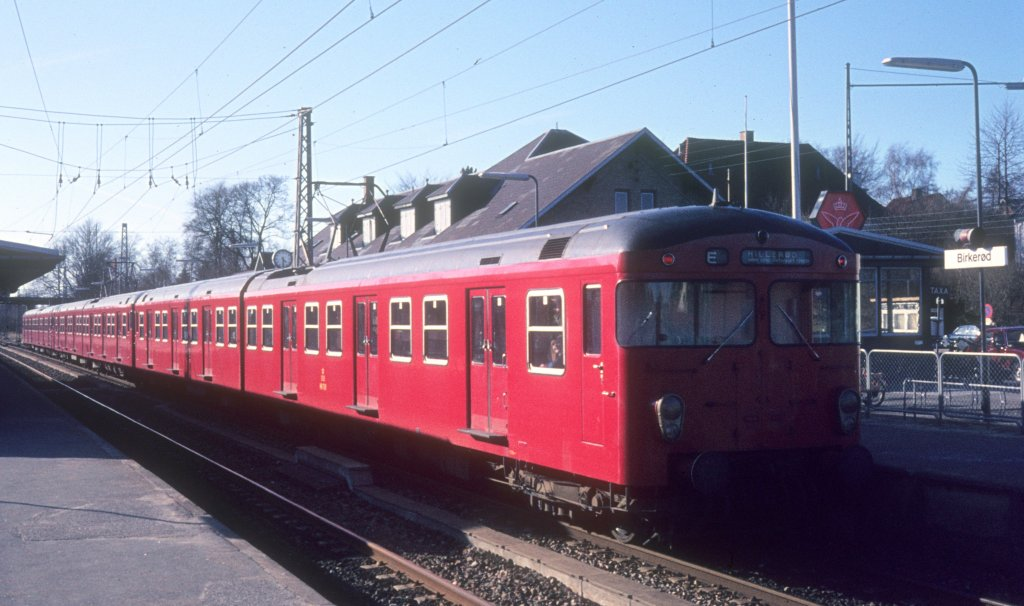
2nd generation S-train at Birkerød in 1975.

Birkerød station opened on 8 June 1864 as the privately owned Det Sjællandske Jernbaneselskab (the Zealand Railway Company) opened the second section of the North Line which connected Copenhagen with Helsingør via Hillerød. On 1 January 1880, the railway station was taken over by the Danish state along with the Zealand Railway Company. And on 1 October 1885, it became part of the new national railway company, the Danish State Railways.

When built, the railroad station was situated a bit outside the old village of Birkerød. The reason for this was that it had to be situated on a hill to make it easier to get the trains started again after stopping. However, the opening of the station led to economic growth in the area and several brickyards opened in the area in the second half of the 19th century, and construction of new residential neighbourhoods accelerated in the 1940s which, in time, made the old village of Birkerød merge with the villages of Bistrup to the south, Kajerød to the west and Ravnsnæs to the east, so today the station is located in the centre of the town.

The railway line proved a great success, and in the 1930s the originally single-track railway line was expanded to double-track. As part of the doubling, an island platform with an associated platform tunnel and a short platform roof was built at the station.

On 26 May 1968, the station at Birkerød became integrated into the S-train network as the S-train line that serves the North Line was extended from Holte to Hillerød.

== Architecture ==
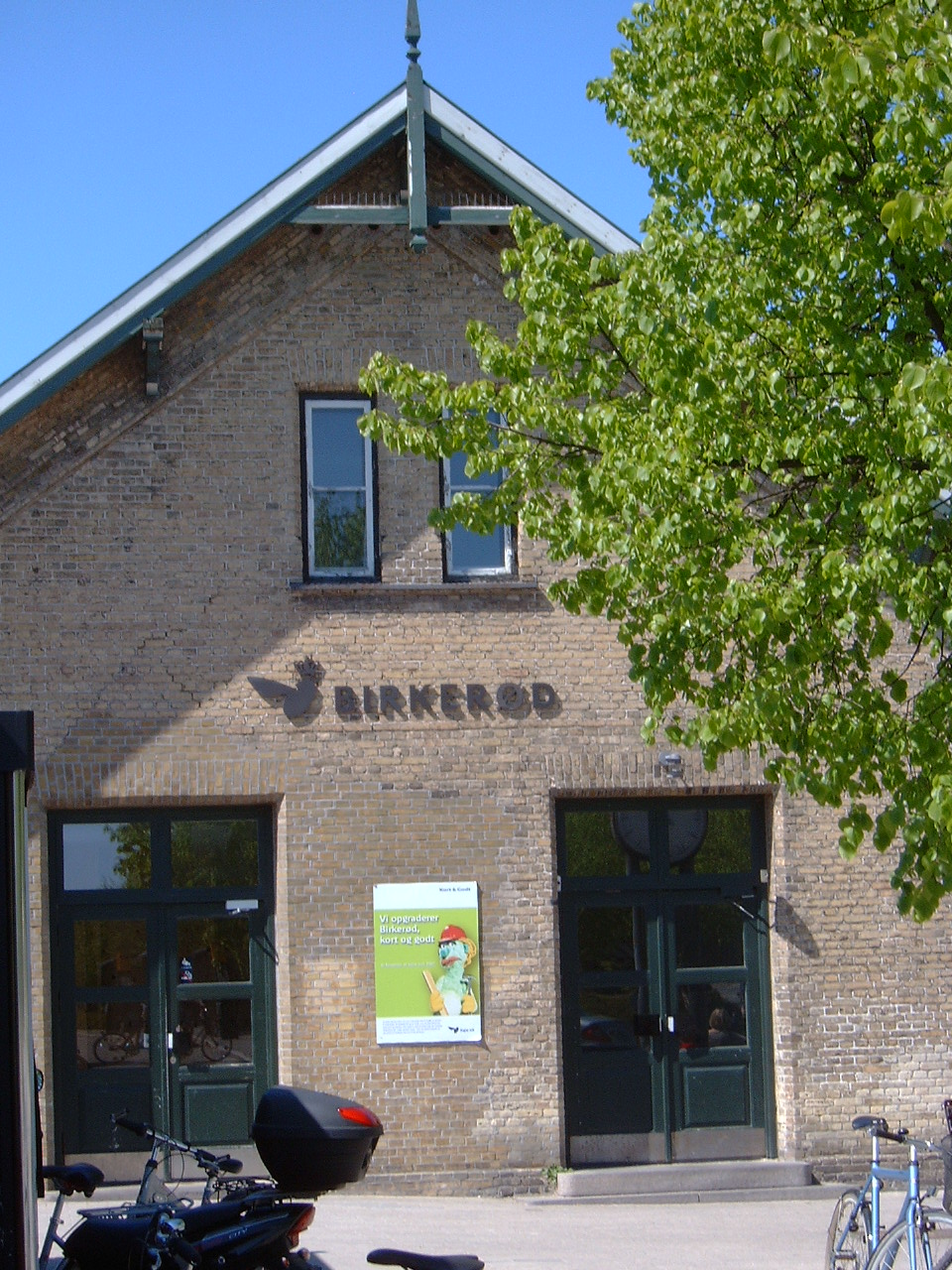
Detail of the station building in 2007.

Like the other station buildings on the North and Klampenborg Lines, Birkerød station's original and still existing station building from 1864 was built to designs by the Danish architect Vilhelm Carl Heinrich Wolf (1833–1893).

The station infrastructure was modernized in 2016 with a new bicycle parking station allowing direct access to the platforms, new platform roofs, and renovated stairs and underpass.

== Facilities ==
Adjacent to the station is the Birkerød bus station. The station forecourt has a taxi stand, and the station also has a bicycle parking station as well as a car park with approximately 174 parking spaces.

== Operations ==
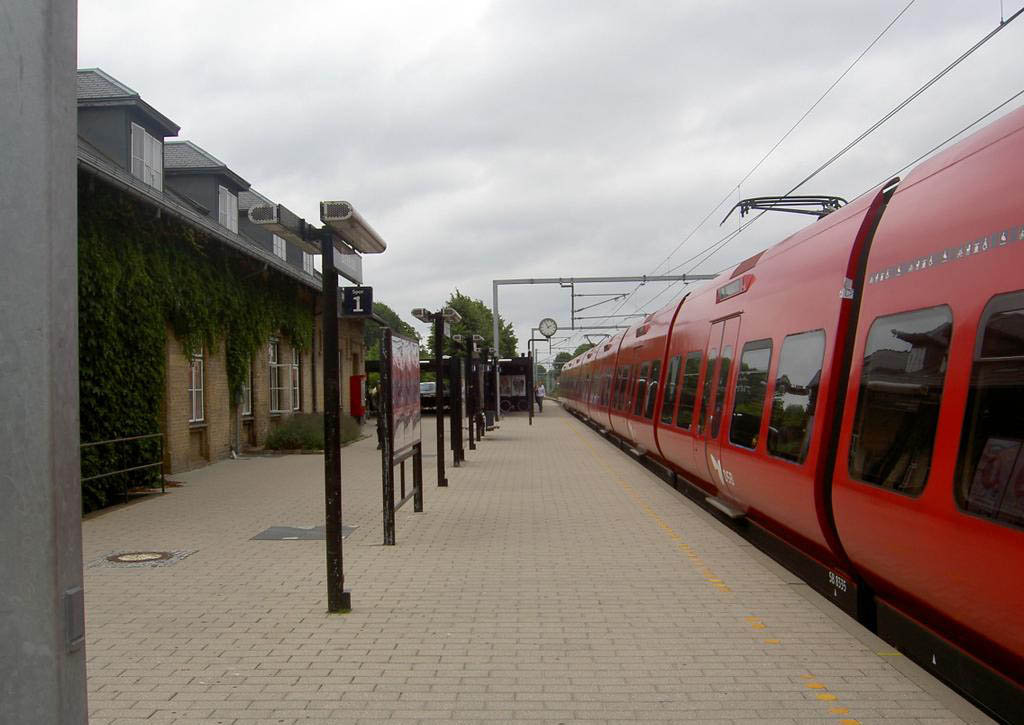
4th generation S-train to Hillerød calling at Birkerød station in 2007.

Birkerød station is served regularly by trains on the A-line of Copenhagen's S-train network which run between Hillerød and Hundige / Køge via central Copenhagen. Trains have a journey time to central Copenhagen of around 20 minutes and to Hillerød of around 10 minutes.

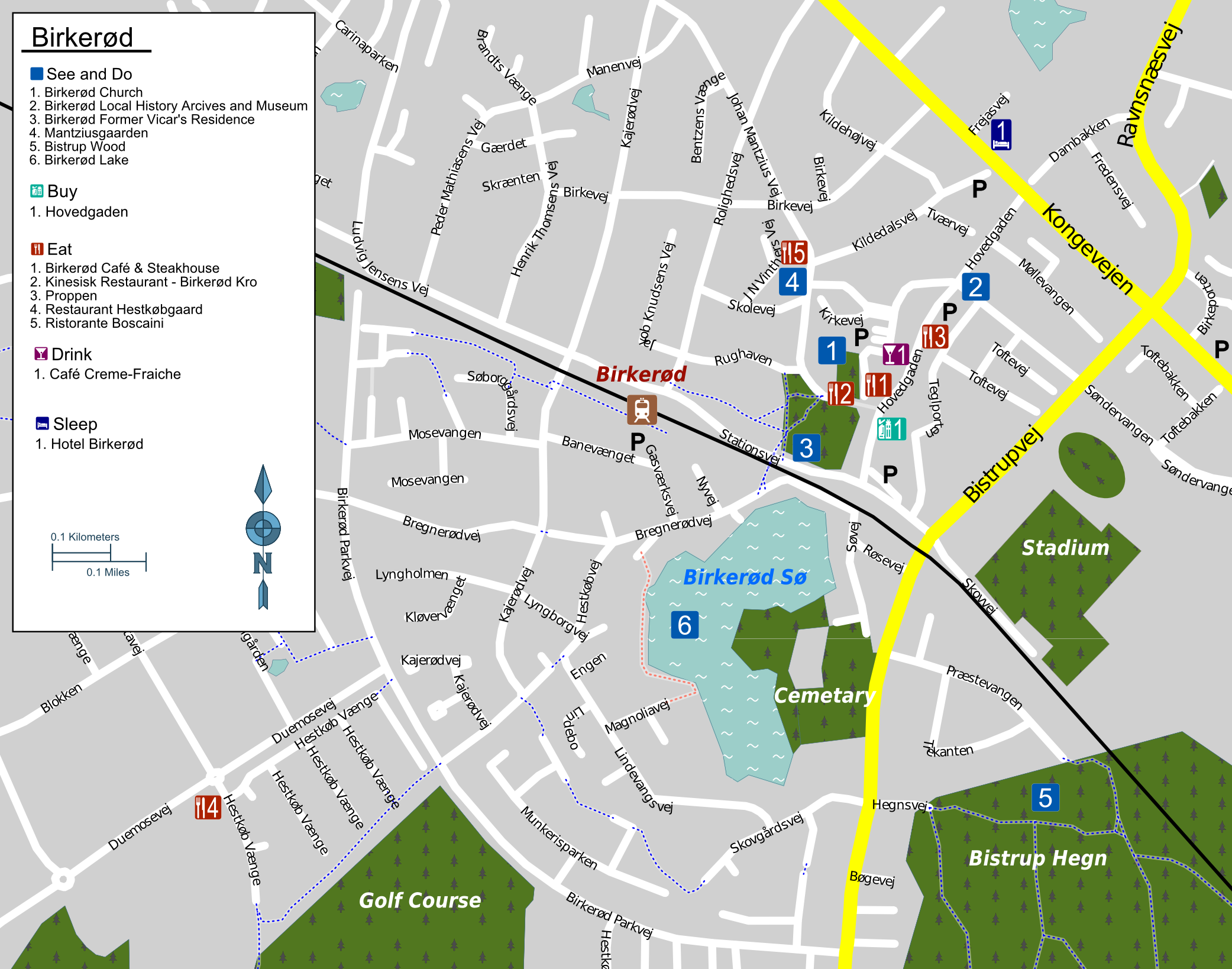
Map of Birkerød showing the central location of the railway station.

== Cultural references ==
In 1984, the local art association arranged for the controversial Danish artist, film director and musician Jens Jørgen Thorsen to decorate an empty concrete wall at the station. He chose to paint the crucified Jesus with an erect penis, which some Christians found blasphemous. After being approached by the Christian People's Party, the then Minister of Transport Arne Melchior ordered the Danish State Railways to have the art work painted over. The affair led to a public debate about both blasphemy and freedom of expression.

== Number of travellers ==
According to the Østtællingen in 2008:

År	Antal	År	Antal	År	Antal	År	Antal
1957	–	1974	3.716	1991	4.413	2001	4.316
1960	–	1975	3.756	1992	4.312	2002	3.993
1962	–	1977	3.631	1993	4.523	2003	4.497
1964	–	1979	4.563	1995	4.662	2004	4.480
1966	–	1981	5.189	1996	4.444	2005	4.001
1968	3.036	1984	4.731	1997	4.462	2006	4.158
1970	3.509	1987	4.537	1998	4.446	2007	4.154
1972	3.818	1990	4.411	2000	4.431	2008	4.402

== Gallery ==
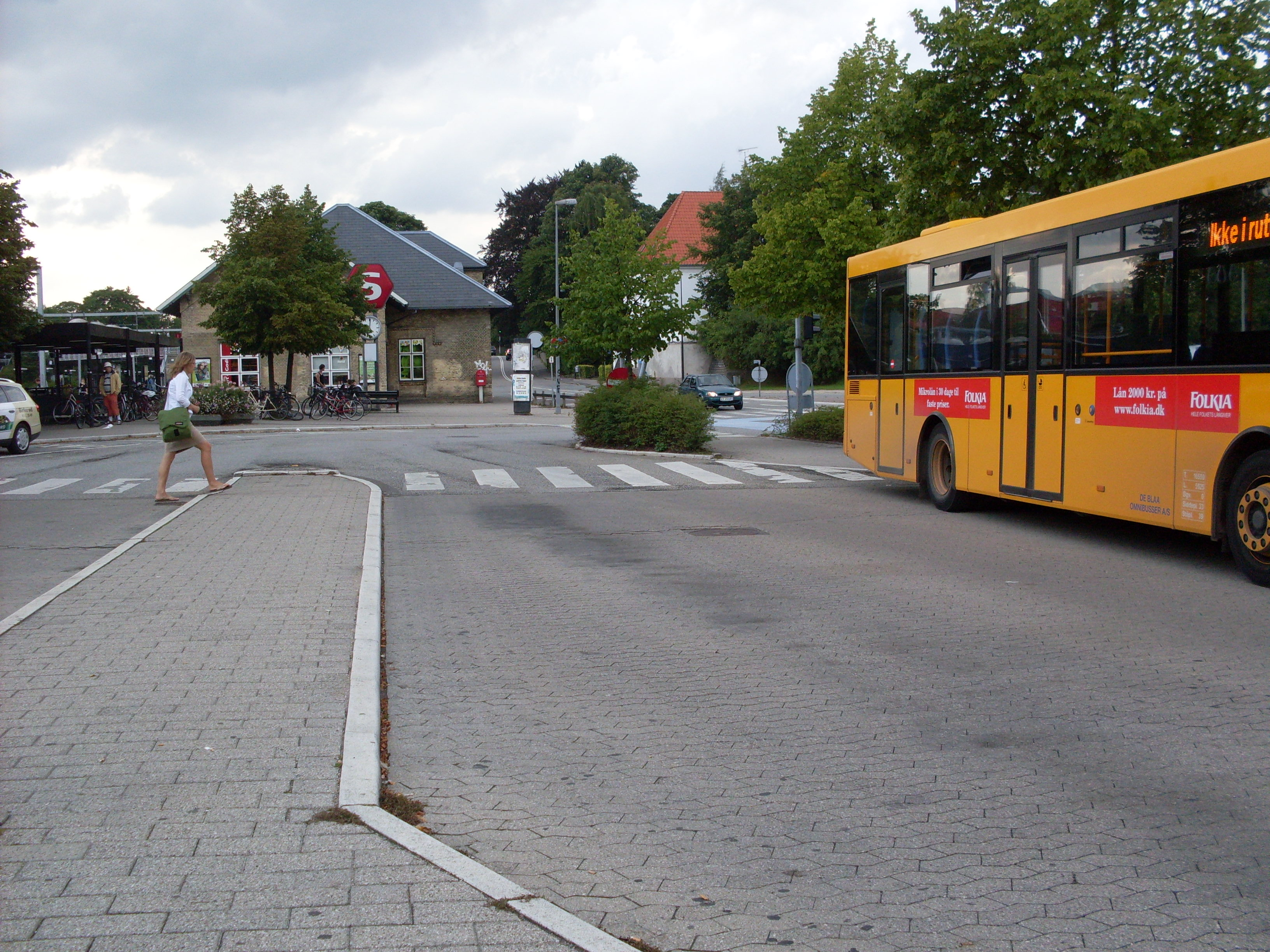
Forecourt

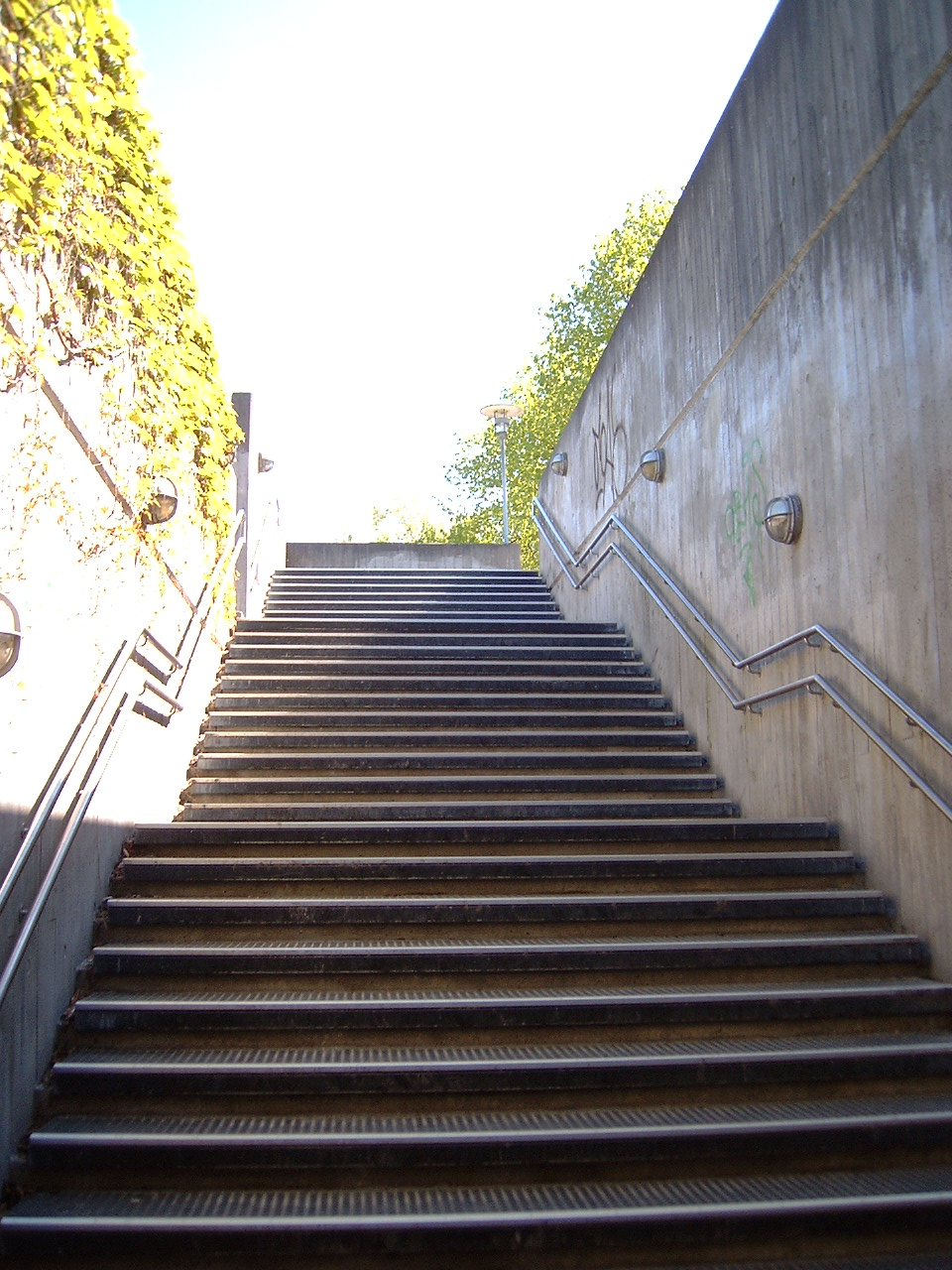
Stairs

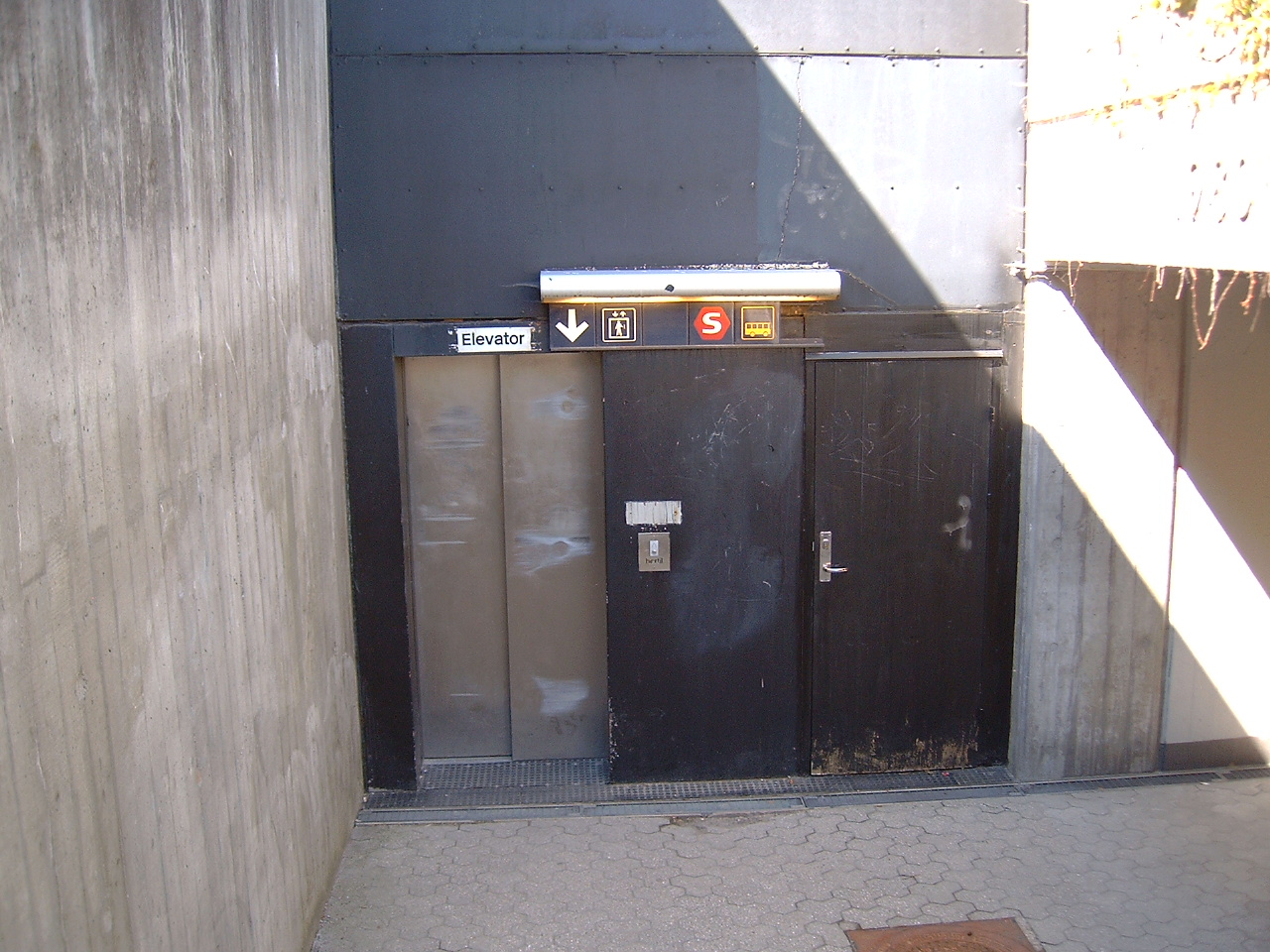
Elevator

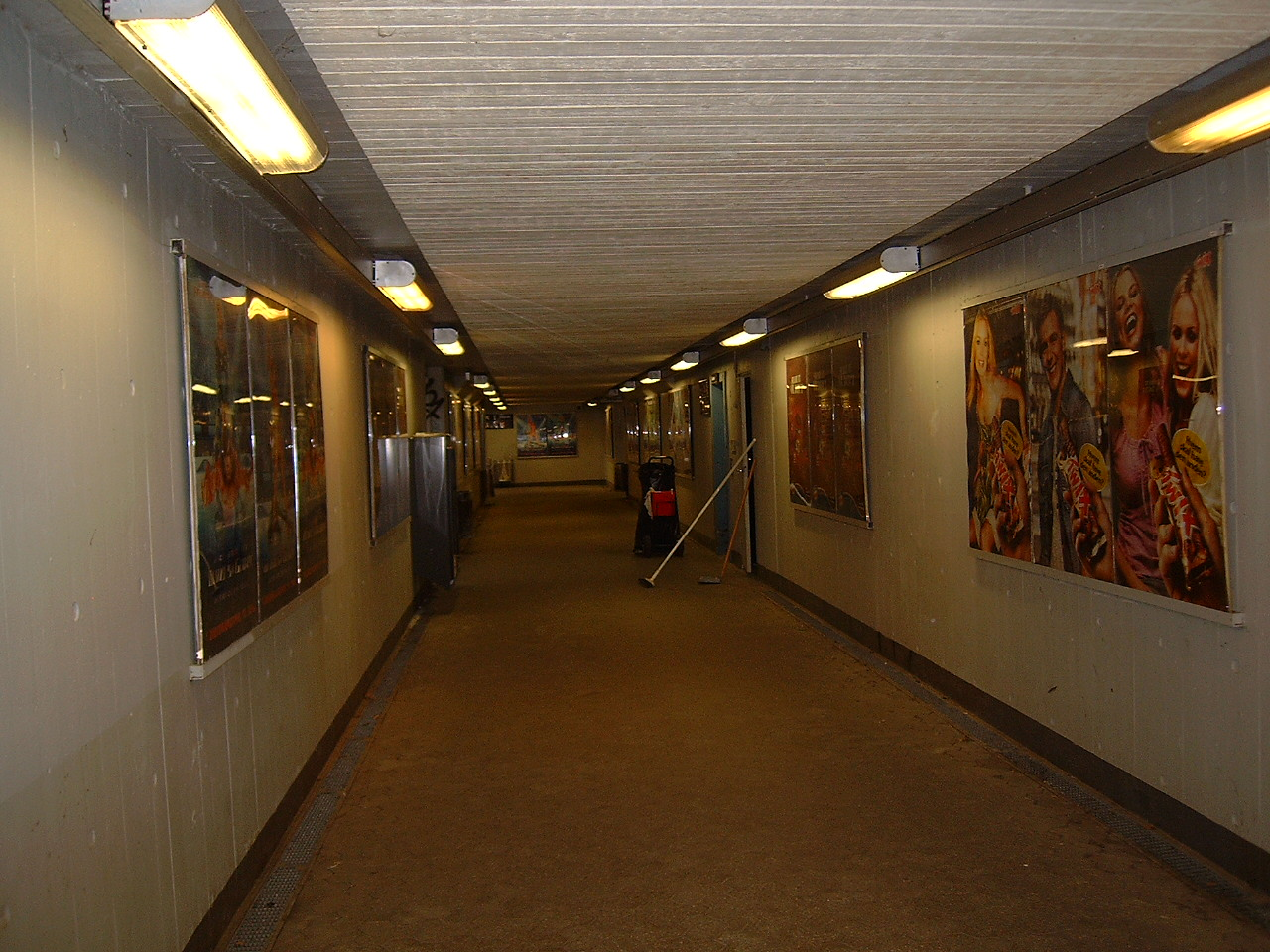
Underpass

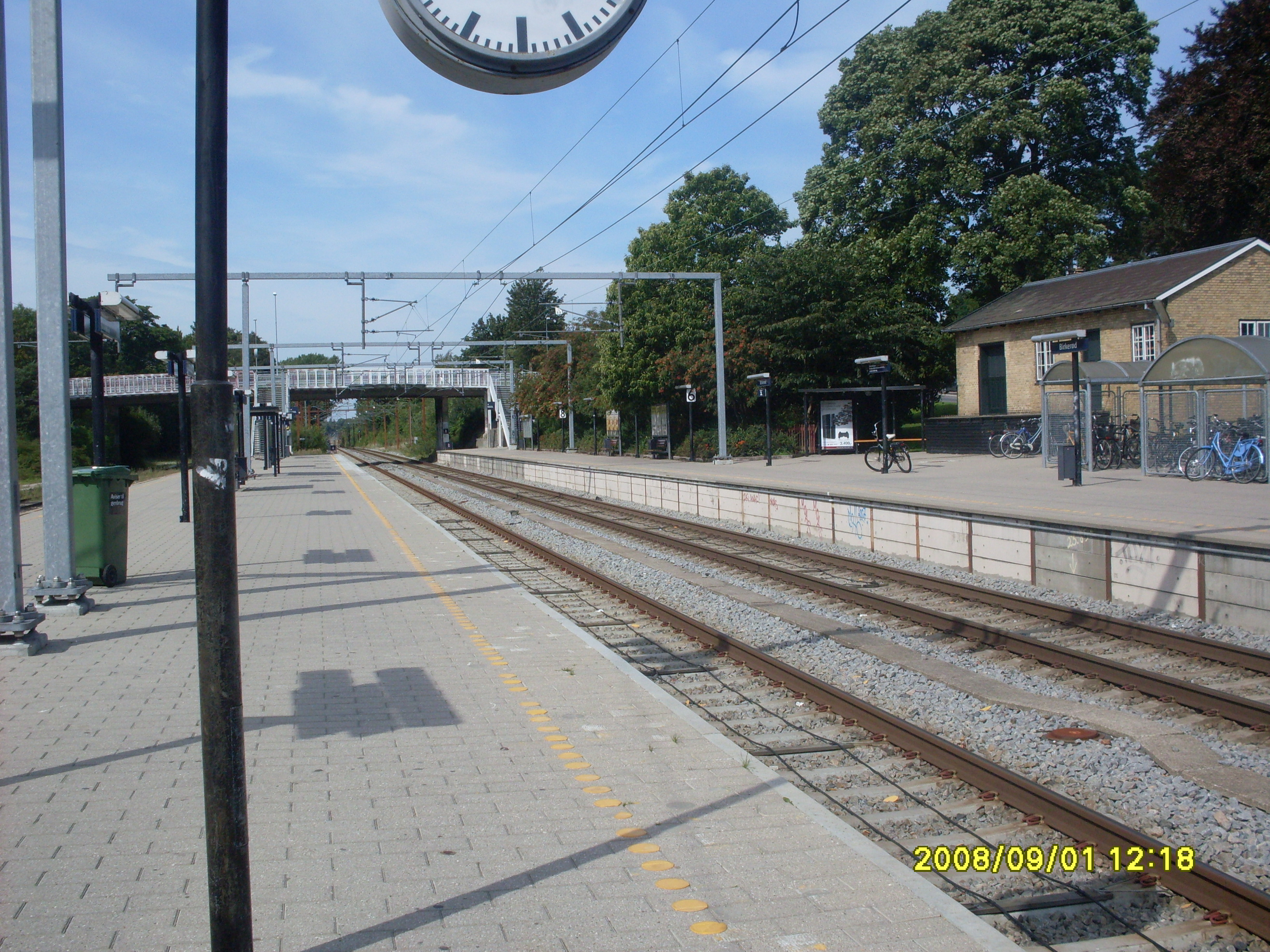
Platforms

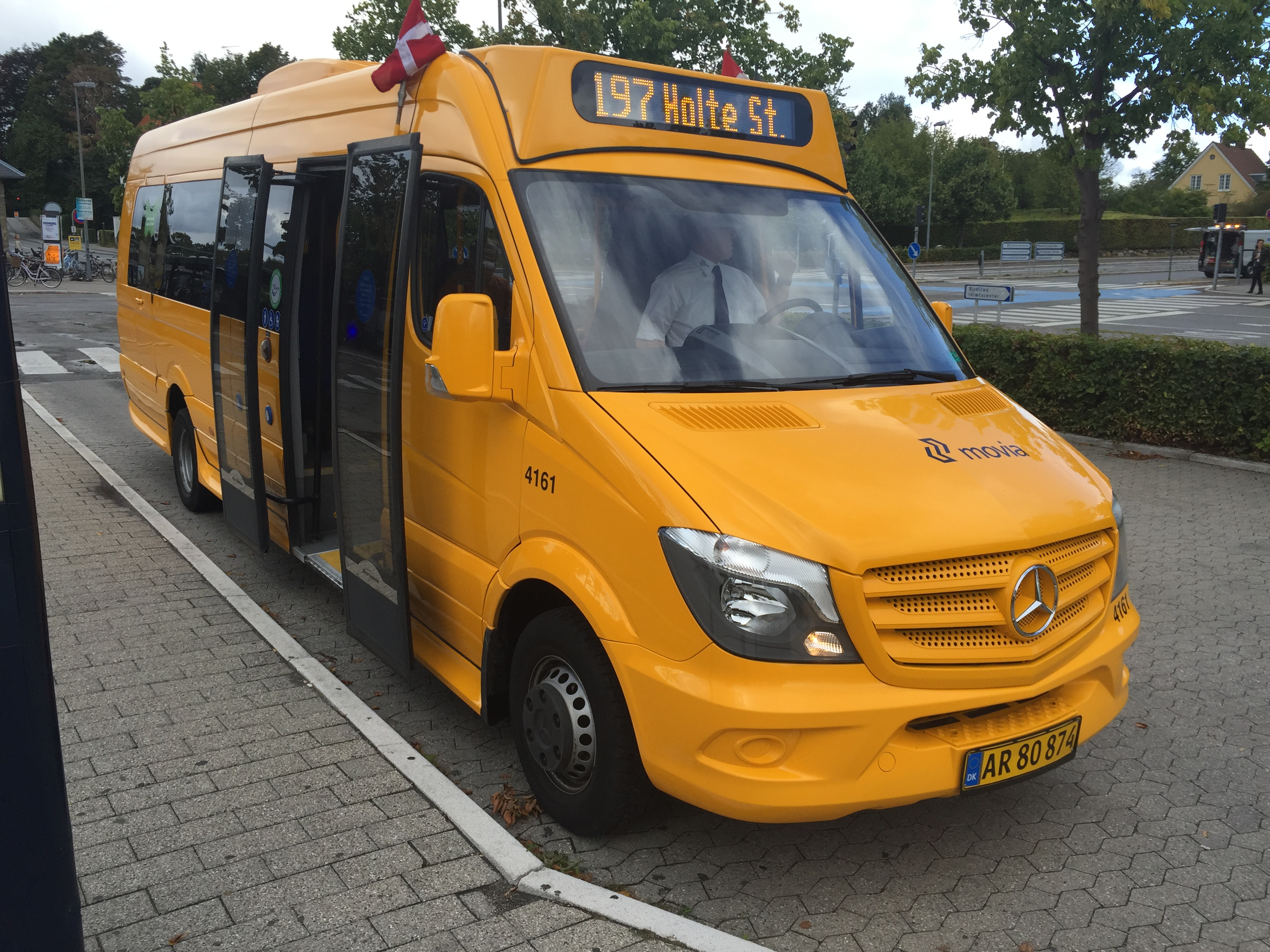
Bus connection

== See also ==
- List of Copenhagen S-train stations
- List of railway stations in Denmark
- Rail transport in Denmark
- Transport in Copenhagen
