= Høvelte railway halt =

Railway halt in North Zealand, Denmark

Høvelte
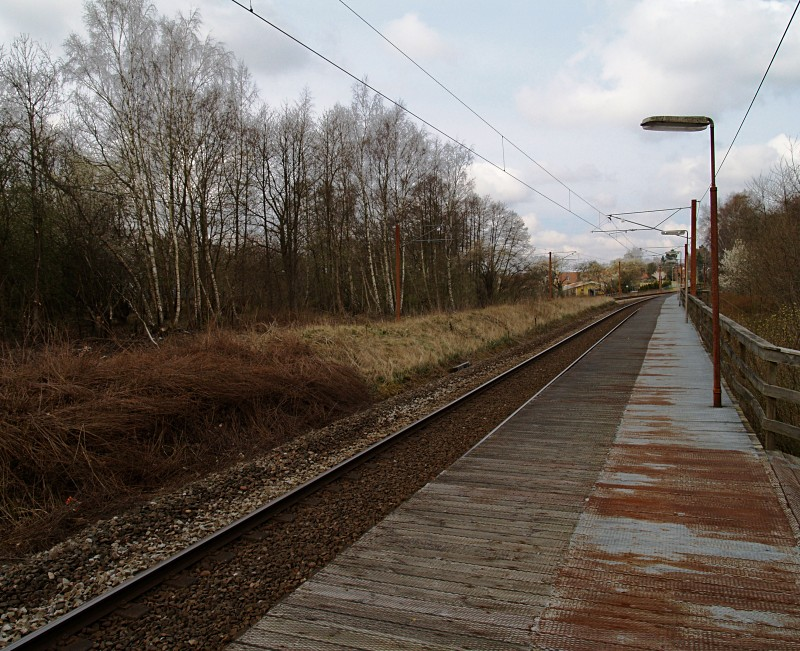
- Platform looking towards Allerød station

General information
- Location: Allerød Municipality; Denmark
- Coordinates: 55°51′3″N 12°23′17″E
- Elevation: 52.6 metres (173 ft)
- System: S-train station
- Owner: DSB
- Operator: DSB
- Lines: North Line
- Platforms: 1 side platform
- Tracks: 1

History
- Opened: 1951

Services
Preceding station	S-train	Following station
Allerød towards Hillerød	A	Birkerød towards Hundige
Allerød towards Hillerød	A Sat–Sun	Birkerød towards Køge
Location

Høvelte railway halt (Danish: Høvelte Trinbræt) is a railway halt on the Hillerød radial of the S-train network in Greater Copenhagen, Denmark. It is located between Birkerød station and Allerød station and primarily serves Høvelte Barracks. There is only one station platform by the northbound track. Only the five first trains in the morning and the five last trains in the night stop and only at request. On Sundays and on holidays it is the last eleven trains.

Maintenance is done by Høvelte Barracks.

The name Høvelte is relatively new. It was introduced in the 1930s. The former name of the locality was Luserød.
