= Nordbanen =

Railway line in North Zealand, Denmark

Coordinates: 55.8585°N 12.3763°E

North Line

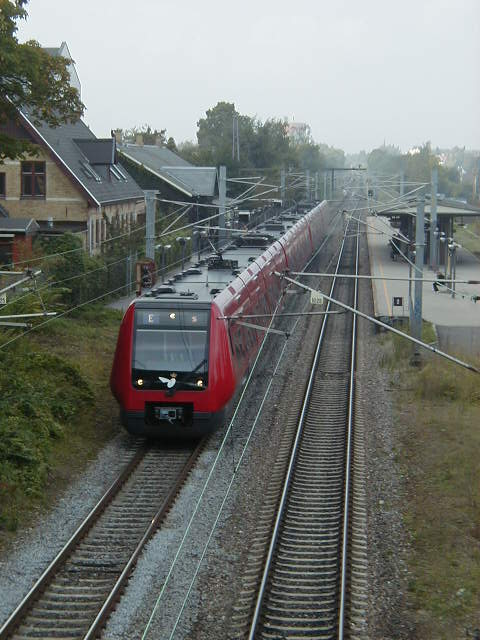
- The North Line at Gentofte in 2001

Overview
- Native name: Nordbanen
- Owner: Banedanmark
- Line number: 820
- Locale: Greater Copenhagen
- Termini: Copenhagen Central; Hillerød
- Stations: 19
- Website: https://bane.dk

Service
- Type: Suburban rail
- System: Copenhagen S-train
- Operator(s): DSB
- Rolling stock: 4th generation S-train

History
- Opened: Copenhagen–Kongens Lyngby: 1 October 1863; Kongens Lyngby–Helsingør: 9 June 1864

Technical
- Line length: 36.5 km (22.7 mi)
- Number of tracks: 2
- Character: Grade-separated
- Track gauge: 1,435 mm (4 ft 8 1/2 in) standard gauge
- Electrification: 1,650 V DC overhead line
- Operating speed: 100 km/h (62 mph)
- Signalling: CBTC
Route map
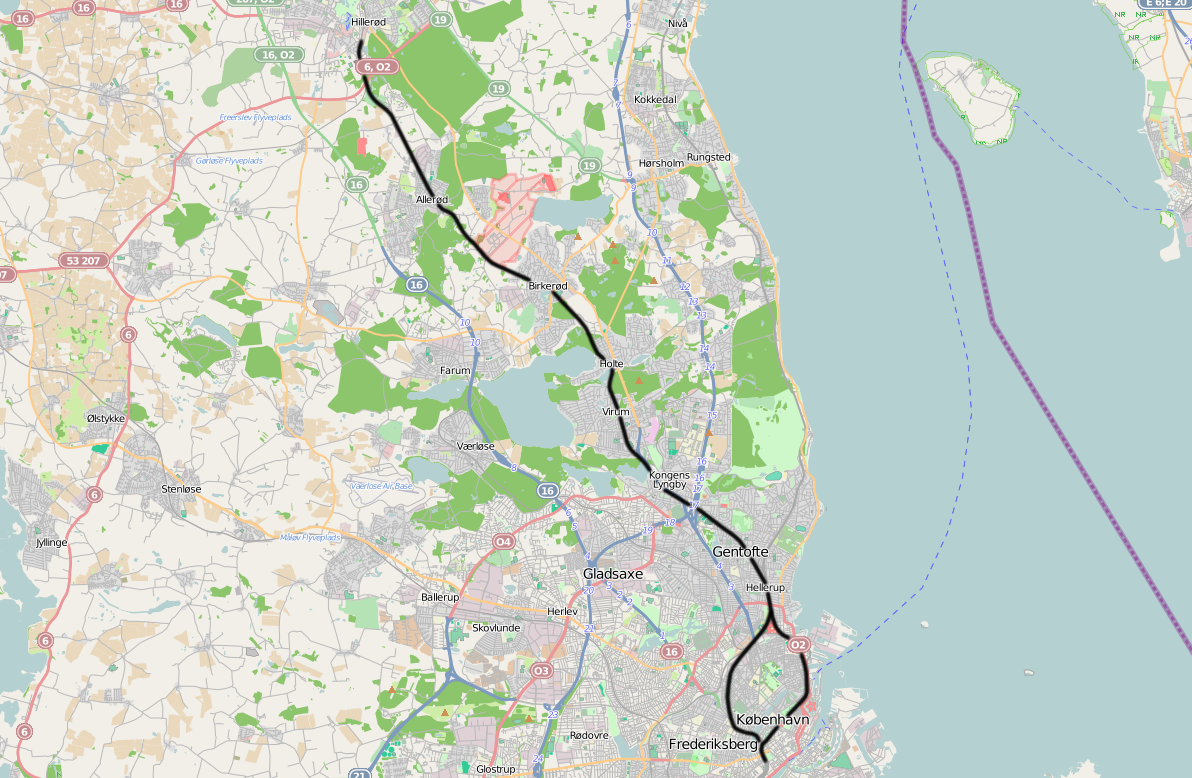
Map of the North Line between Copenhagen and Hillerød

The North Line (Danish: Nordbanen) is a 36.5 kilometres (22.7 mi) railway line which connects the centre of Copenhagen with several of its northern suburbs, and the cities of Birkerød, Lillerød and Hillerød in North Zealand, Denmark. It is one of the six radial lines of Copenhagen's S-train network, a hybrid commuter rail and rapid transit system serving Greater Copenhagen.

The North Line opened in 1864, and was originally the main line between Copenhagen and Elsinore until the more direct Coast Line opened in 1897. Today, the name refers to electrified section between Copenhagen and Hillerød, which is integrated with Copenhagen's S-train network. The rump section from Hillerød to Elsinore still exists and is today known as the Little North Line operated by the regional railway company Lokaltog.

== History ==
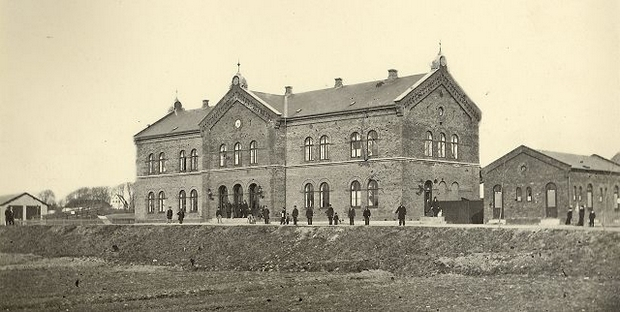
Hillerød station in 1880.

The North Line was completed for the privately owned Zealand Railway Company (Danish: Det Sjællandske Jernbaneselskab) and was the second railway to reach Copenhagen in 1863. The original North Line connected Copenhagen with Elsinore on the north coast of Zealand via Hillerød and was originally the main line between Copenhagen and Elsinore before the more direct Coast Line opened in 1897. On 1 January 1880, the railway line was taken over by the Danish state along with the Zealand Railway Company. And on 1 October 1885, it became part of the new national railway company, the Danish State Railways.

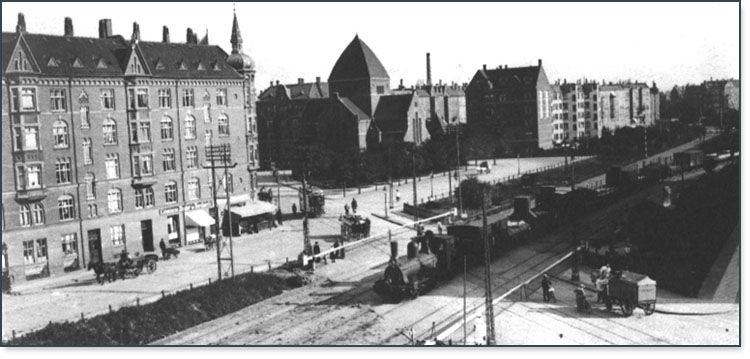
The original route of the North Line crossing Rantzausgade in Nørrebro. The church in the background is Brorson's Church.

South of Hellerup the original North Line followed a much more westerly route than the current line, taking it along the present Ring Line alignment to Ryparken and thence through Nørrebro and across the lakes of Copenhagen on a narrow dam along Gyldenløvesgade to reach the 1863–1911 Copenhagen Central Station at present-day Kampmannsgade. The trains to Holte and Hillerød moved to the current line in 1921, but the old alignment was used by freight trains until 1930 and still leaves clear traces on a modern street map.

The line from Hellerup to the new central station had four tracks of which trains on Nordbanen used the two western ones and trains on Kystbanen used the two eastern ones. In 1928 two new tracks for local trains to Klampenborg were added to Kystbanen; these connected to Nordbanen's tracks at Hellerup. Thus when the first S-trains were introduced on the Klampenborg line in 1934 it was the Nordbanen tracks between København H and Hellerup that were electrified. But then plans to also electrify Nordbanen as far as Holte were already underfoot.

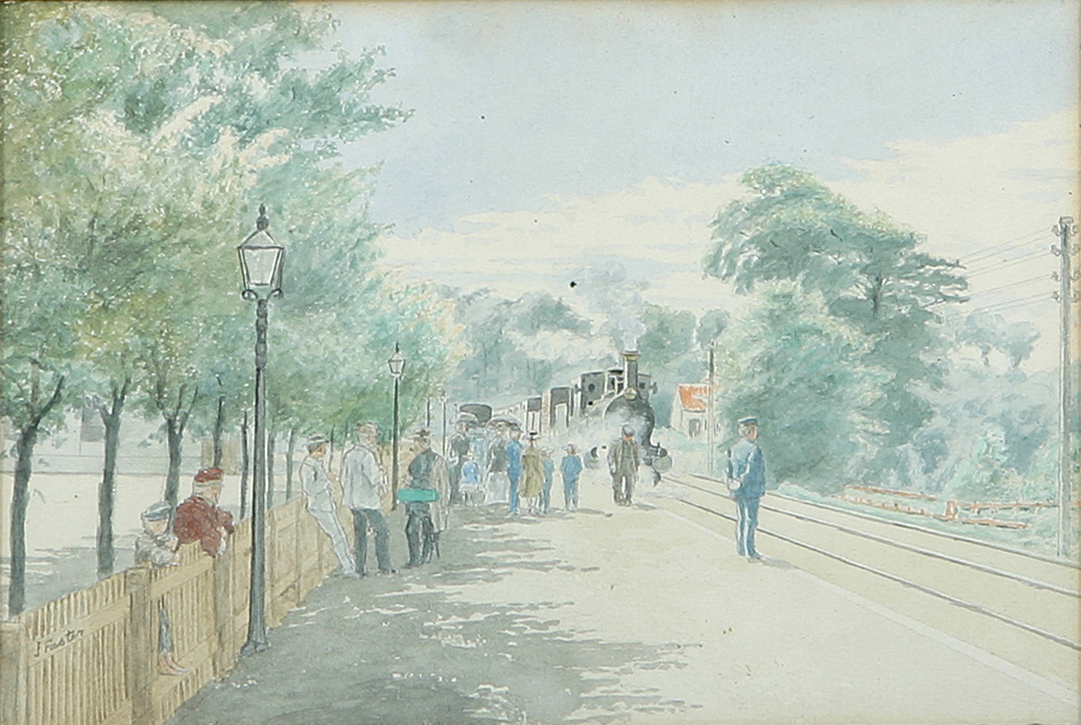
Scenery from Holte station. Painting by Hans Julius Fæster, c. 1900.

Early on, a service pattern had been established in which local trains between Copenhagen and Holte were complemented by trains to Hillerød and Helsingør which ran non-stop until Holte. The local trains to Holte were converted to S-trains in 1936, but trains to Hillerød and beyond were still steam trains for several decades, even though they shared the S-train tracks south of Holte.

The Hillerød trains became a problem in the 1960s when capacity on the central S-train section became a limiting factor for service extensions on the western radials. The steam trains had poor acceleration relative to the S-trains and therefore tied up the tracks for twice as long as an S-train would. In order to free this capacity the line from Holte to Hillerød was electrified in 1968 and the steam trains replaced by S-trains.

The first-class cars were declassified to second class in 1972.

Likewise, the Hillerød trains kept the stopping pattern of the steam trains and ran non-stop all the way from Østerport to Holte. Only from 1989 did this tradition break down, and the Hillerød services gradually gained intermediate stops at Hellerup (1989) and Lyngby (1991), and finally (1995) at all stations between Østerport and Hellerup.

== Stations ==
Name	Services	Opened	S-trains	Comments
København H	B, E	30 November 1911	15 May 1934	Central station; also all other radials; bus terminal; cross-link express bus 250S
Vesterport	B, E	15 May 1934		Also all other radials
Nørreport	B, E	1 July 1918	15 May 1934	Also all other radials; transfer to metro; bus terminal; cross-link express buses 150S and 350S
Østerport	B, E	2 August 1897	15 May 1934	Also all other radials; named Østerbro until 1934
Nordhavn	B, E	15 May 1934		Also Farum and Klampenborg radials
Svanemøllen	B, E	15 May 1934		Also Farum and Klampenborg radials
Hellerup	B, E	22 July 1863	15 May 1934	Also Klampenborg radial; transfer to ring line; bus terminal
Bernstorffsvej	B	15 May 1936		
Gentofte	B	1 October 1863	15 May 1936	
Jægersborg	B, E	15 May 1936		Transfer to Nærumbanen
Lyngby	B, E	1 October 1863	15 May 1936	Major bus terminal; cross-link express buses 300S, 400S
Sorgenfri	B	15 May 1936		
Virum	B	15 May 1936		
Holte	B, E	8 June 1864	15 May 1936	Service B terminates; bus terminal
Birkerød	E	8 June 1864	26 May 1968	Cross-link express bus 500S
Høvelte	(E)	??	26 May 1968	Military base train station; not in the public timetable; only few trains from Copenhagen, none to Copenhagen
Allerød	E	8 June 1864	26 May 1968	Named Lillerød until 1952
Favrholm	E	10 December 2023		Transfer to Frederiksværkbanen
Hillerød	E	8 June 1864	26 May 1968	Transfer to Frederiksværkbanen, Gribskovbanen, Lille Nord; major bus terminal; cross-link express bus 600S

== Service patterns ==
The weekday service consists of service A which stops at all stations until Holte, and E which runs with limited stops until Holte and then stops at all stations until Hillerød. On weekends and evenings, only service A runs, stopping at all stations.

Between 1950 and 1989 rush-hour and limited-stop on the radial ran under service letters C, Cc and Cx. Service A ran on Nordbanen from 1979 to 2007, first as the stopping service until Holte and later (from 1989) as the limited-stop service to Hillerød.

== See also ==
- List of Copenhagen S-train lines
- Transportation in Copenhagen
- List of railway lines in Denmark
- Rail transport in Denmark
- Transportation in Denmark
- History of rail transport in Denmark
- S-train (Copenhagen)
- Banedanmark
