= Allerød railway station =

Railway station in North Zealand, Denmark

Allerød
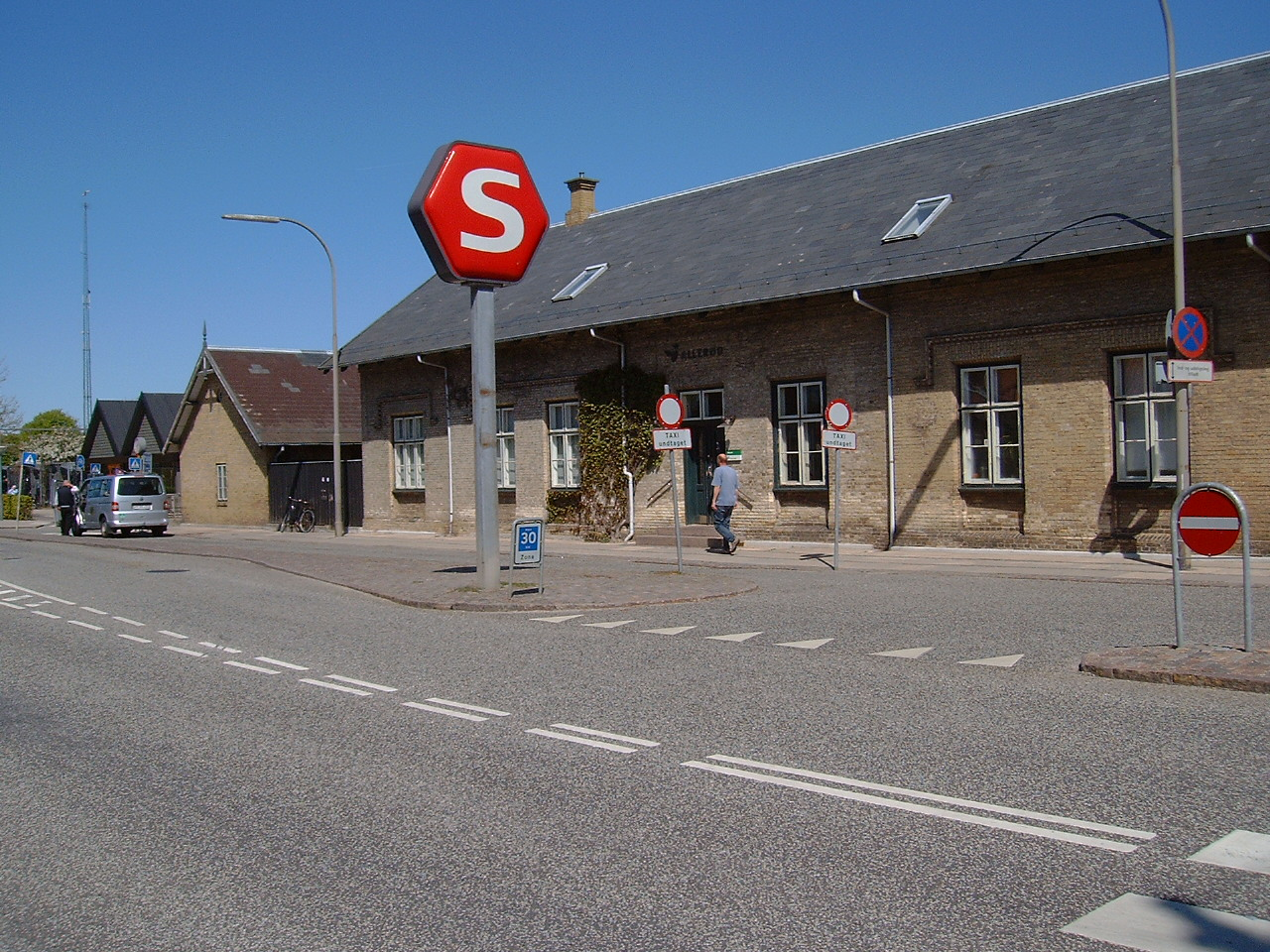
- Allerød station in 2007

General information
- Location: Allerød Stationsvej 4A; 3450 Allerød; Allerød Municipality; Denmark
- Coordinates: 55.871°N 12.357°E
- Elevation: 48.5 metres (159 ft)
- System: S-train station
- Owner: DSB (station infrastructure); Banedanmark (rail infrastructure)
- Line: North Line
- Platforms: 1 Island platform 1 Side platform
- Tracks: 3
- Train operators: DSB
- Connections: Bus

Construction
- Structure type: At-grade
- Cycle facilities: Bicycle parking station
- Architect: Vilhelm Carl Heinrich Wolf

Other information
- Station code: Li
- Website: Official website

History
- Opened: 8 June 1864; 162 years ago
- Electrified: 1968
- Former names: Lillerød station (until 1952)

Services
Preceding station	S-train	Following station
Favrholm towards Hillerød	A	Høvelte towards Hundige
Favrholm towards Hillerød	A Sat–Sun	Høvelte towards Køge
Location
- Location within Denmark

Allerød station (until 1952: Lillerød station) is an S-train railway station serving the satellite town of Lillerød in Allerød municipality north of Copenhagen, Denmark. The station is located in the centre of the modern town, c. 0.5 kilometres (0.31 mi) from the historic village of Lillerød and close to the Tokkekøb Hegn and Ravnsholt Skov forests.

Allerød station is located on the Hillerød radial of Copenhagen's S-train network, a hybrid commuter rail and rapid transit system serving Greater Copenhagen. It is served regularly by trains on the A-line which have a journey time to central Copenhagen of around 30 minutes. The station opened in 1864, and has been served by the S-train network since 1968. The original and still existing station building from 1864 was designed by the Danish architect Vilhelm Carl Heinrich Wolf.

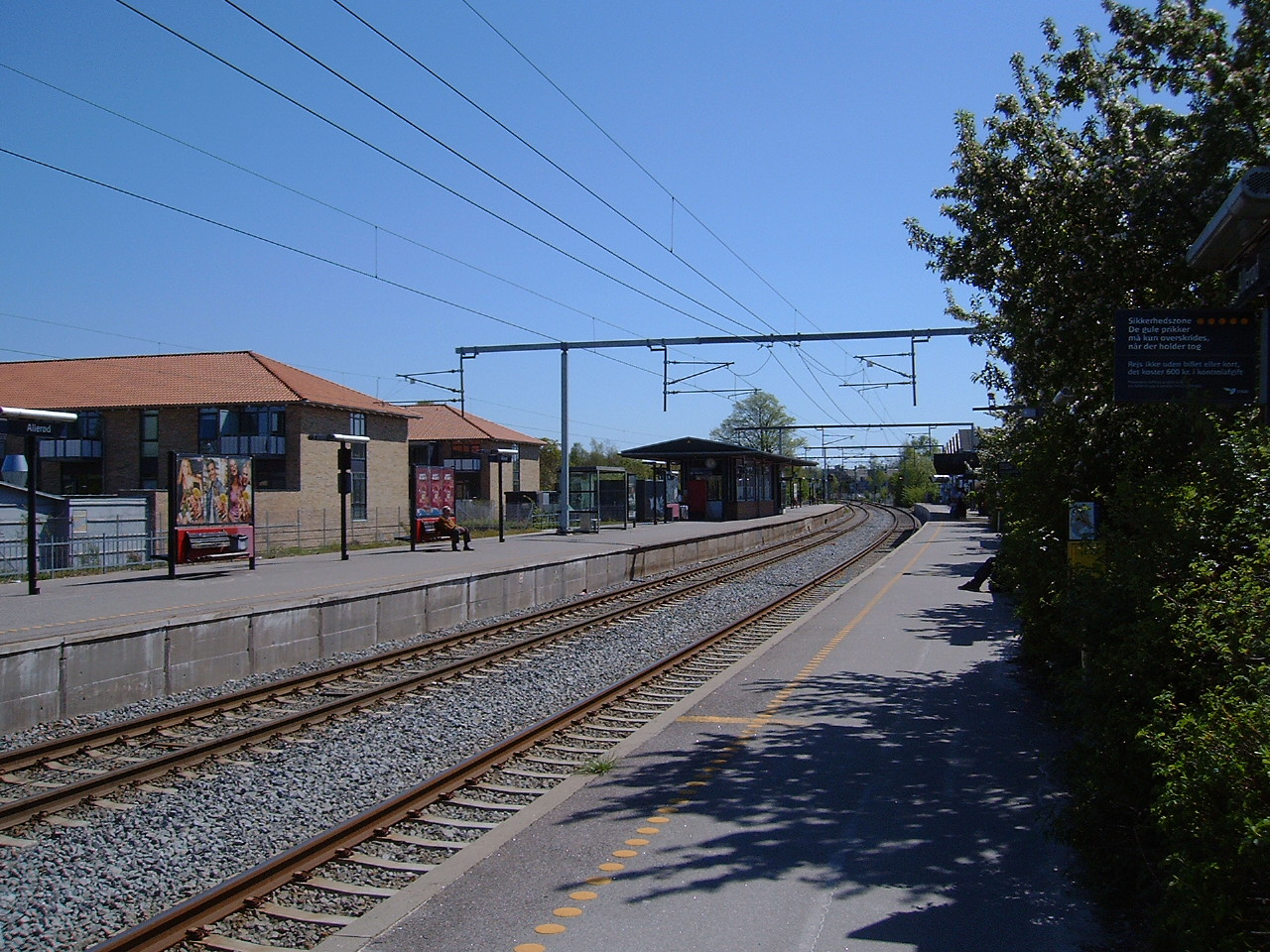
The platforms and two of the tracks

== History ==
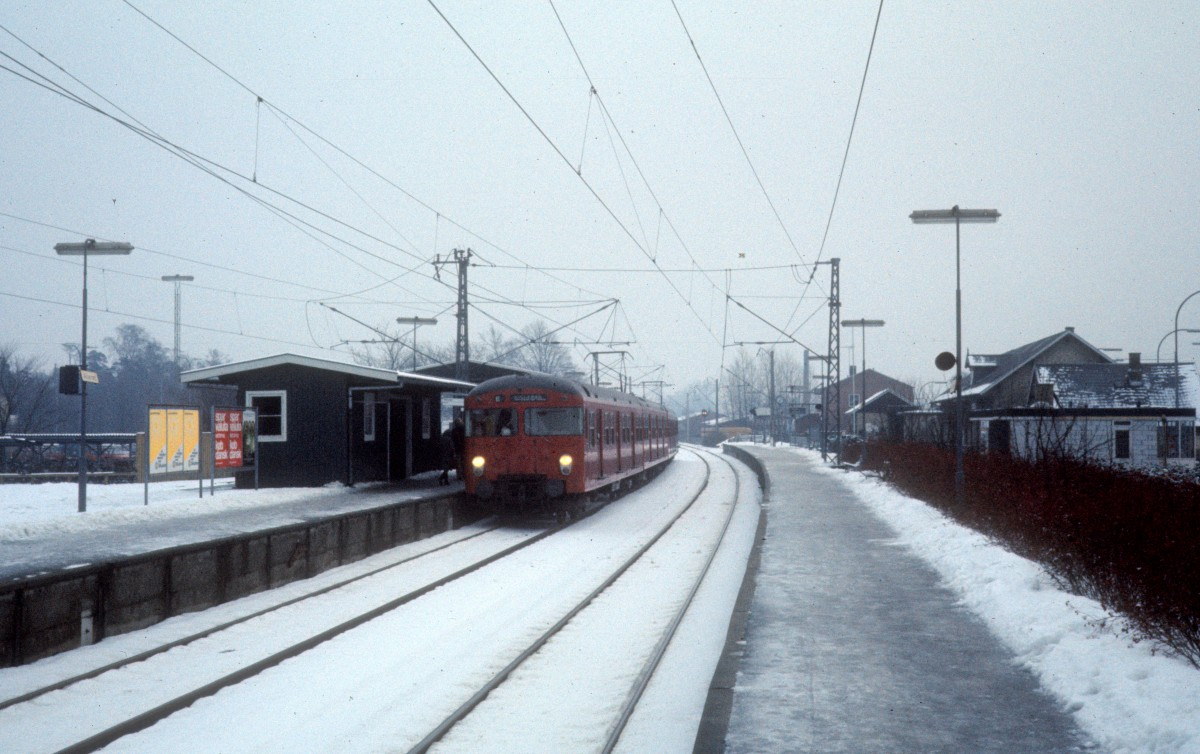
2nd generation S-train to Hillerød calling at Allerød in 1977.

Allerød station was inaugurated on 8 June 1864 as one of the original intermediate stations on the original North Line between Copenhagen and Helsingør via Hillerød which was opened by the privately owned Det Sjællandske Jernbaneselskab (English: the Zealand Railway Company). On 1 January 1880, the railway station was taken over by the Danish state along with the Zealand Railway Company. And on 1 October 1885, it became part of the new national railway company, the Danish State Railways.

Originally the station was named Lillerød, but the name was changed in 1952 to prevent confusion with nearby Hillerød.

The station has been served by the S-train network since 1968.

== Architecture ==
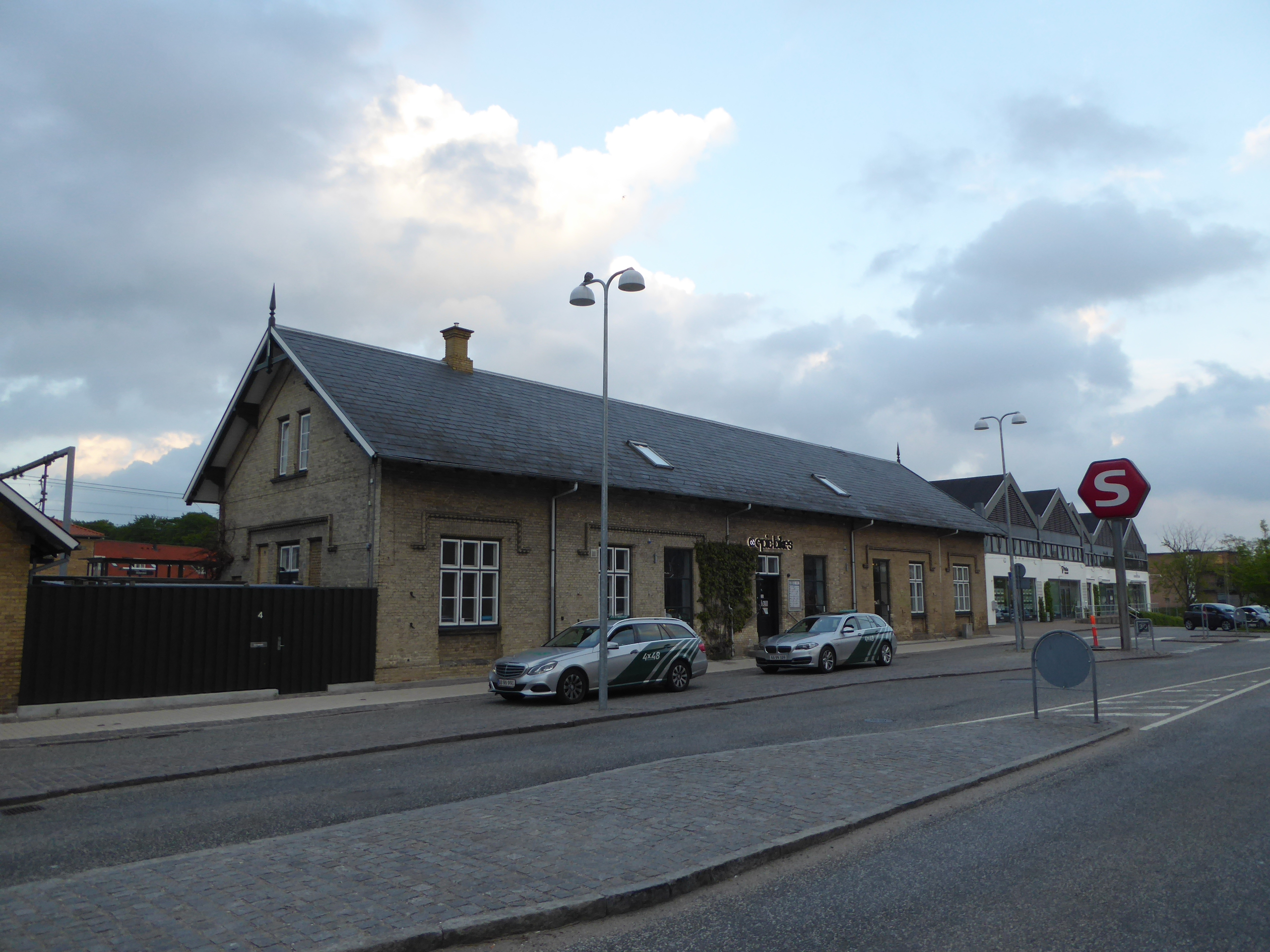
Street facade of the station building in 2016.

Like the other station buildings on the North and Klampenborg Lines, Allerød station's original and still existing station building from 1864 was built to designs by the Danish architect Vilhelm Carl Heinrich Wolf (1833–1893).

The station was renovated and modernized in 2016.

== Facilities ==
Adjacent to the station is the Allerød bus station. The station forecourt has a taxi stand, and the station also has a bicycle parking station as well as a car park.

== Operations ==
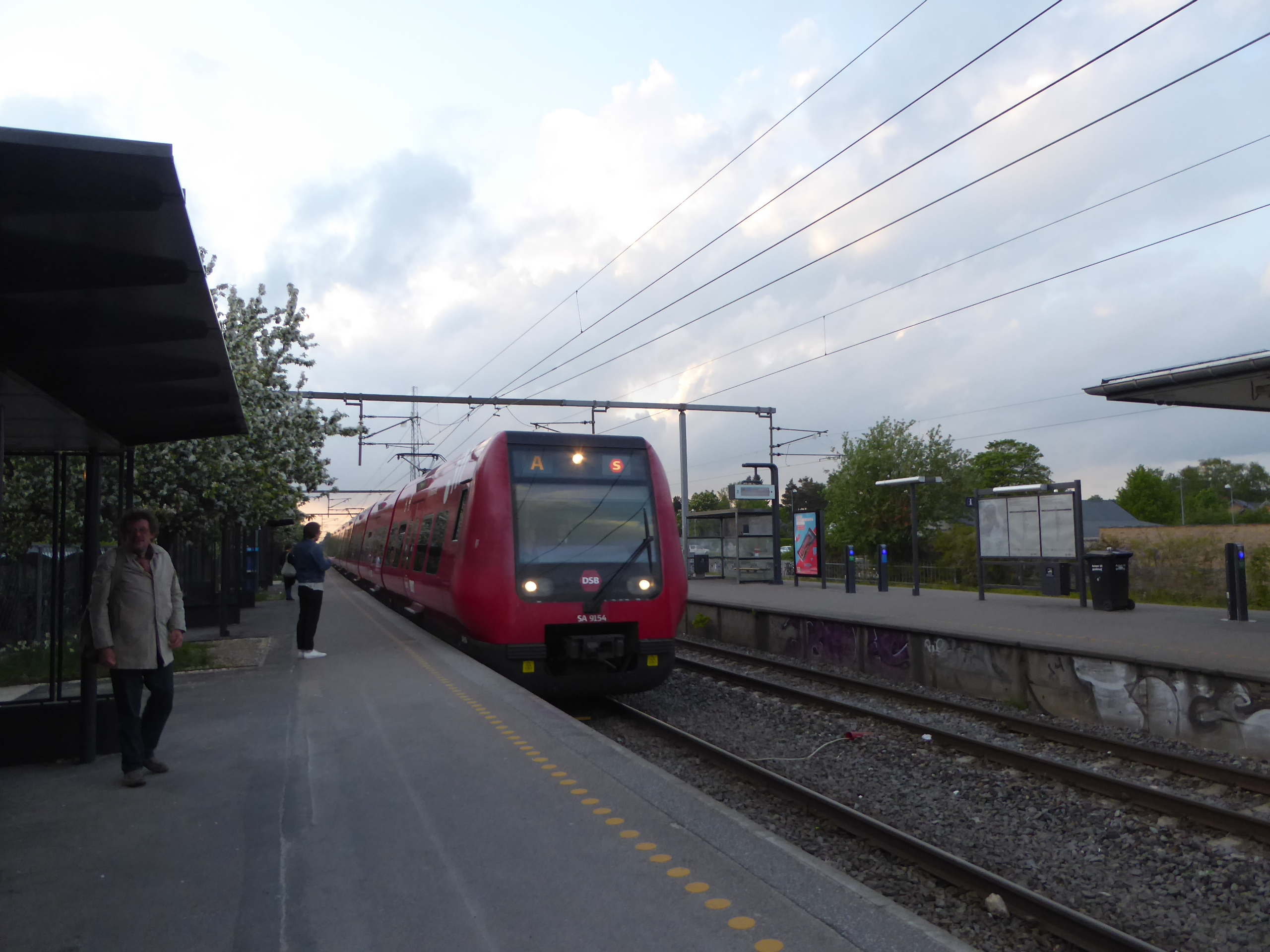
4th generation S-train to Køge calling at Allerød station in 2016.

Allerød station is served regularly by trains on the A-line of Copenhagen's S-train network which run between Hillerød and Hundige / Køge via central Copenhagen. Trains have a journey time to central Copenhagen of around 30 minutes and to Hillerød of around 5 minutes.

== Number of travellers ==
According to the Østtællingen in 2008:

År	Antal	År	Antal	År	Antal	År	Antal
1957	-	1974	3.033	1991	4.452	2001	4.276
1960	-	1975	3.291	1992	4.873	2002	3.978
1962	-	1977	3.303	1993	4.859	2003	4.093
1964	-	1979	4.236	1995	5.167	2004	4.033
1966	-	1981	4.382	1996	4.612	2005	3.843
1968	2.164	1984	4.770	1997	4.623	2006	3.906
1970	2.464	1987	3.973	1998	4.586	2007	4.144
1972	2.663	1990	4.505	2000	4.567	2008	4.041

== See also ==
- List of Copenhagen S-train stations
- List of railway stations in Denmark
- Transport in Copenhagen
- Rail transport in Denmark
- History of rail transport in Denmark
- Transport in Denmark
