= Holte railway station =

Railway station in Holte, Denmark

Holte
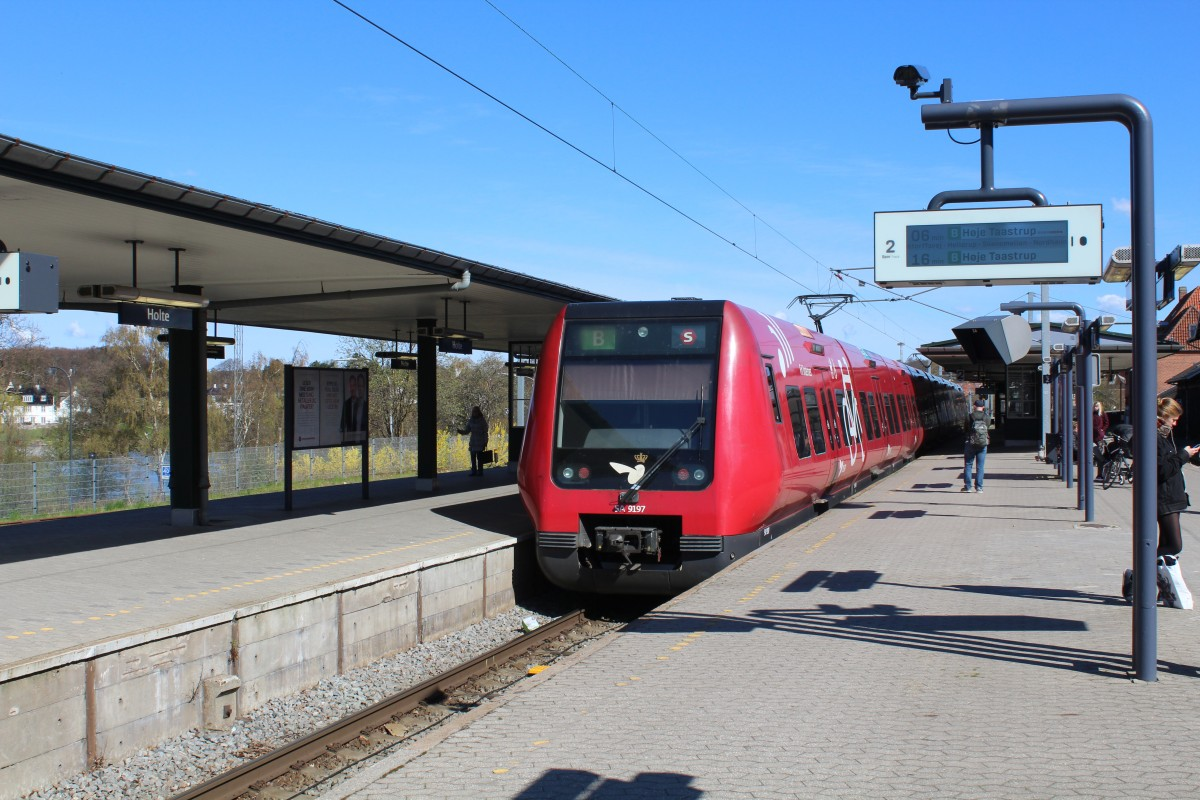
- Holte station in 2014

General information
- Location: Stationsvej 36; 2840 Holte; Rudersdal Municipality; Denmark
- Coordinates: 55°48′27″N 12°28′6″E
- Elevation: 28.3 metres (93 ft)
- Owner: DSB (station infrastructure); Banedanmark (rail infrastructure)
- Line: North Line
- Platforms: 2 island platforms
- Tracks: 4 (3 platform tracks)
- Train operators: DSB
- Bus routes: 9
- Bus operators: Movia
- Connections: Bus terminal

Construction
- Parking: 257 spots
- Cycle facilities: Yes, covered parking

Other information
- Website: Official website

History
- Opened: 1864
- Electrified: May 15, 1936 using 1,650 V DC overhead lines

Passengers
- 2004: 7.687

Services
Preceding station	S-train	Following station
Birkerød towards Hillerød	A	Lyngby towards Hundige
Terminus	E Mon–Fri	Virum towards Køge
Birkerød towards Hillerød	A Sat–Sun	Virum towards Køge
Location

Holte station is a railway station serving the suburb of Holte north of Copenhagen, Denmark. It is served by S-trains on the Hillerød radial of Copenhagen's S-train network. The station is also served by nine bus routes, providing connections to all nearby towns and villages.

== History ==
The location was chosen as a railway stopping place, which was used as a location for drawing water into the steam trains.

== Number of travellers ==
According to the Østtællingen in 2008:

År	Antal	År	Antal	År	Antal	År	Antal
1957	-	1974	5.273	1991	4.801	2001	3.946
1960	-	1975	4.570	1992	4.544	2002	3.547
1962	-	1977	4.097	1993	4.866	2003	3.821
1964	-	1979	5.076	1995	4.314	2004	3.798
1966	-	1981	5.420	1996	4.328	2005	3.709
1968	4.511	1984	5.212	1997	4.296	2006	3.410
1970	5.013	1987	4.930	1998	4.354	2007	3.661
1972	5.321	1990	4.603	2000	4.074	2008	3.695

== See also ==
- List of Copenhagen S-train stations
- List of railway stations in Denmark
