= Thyregod =

- Town
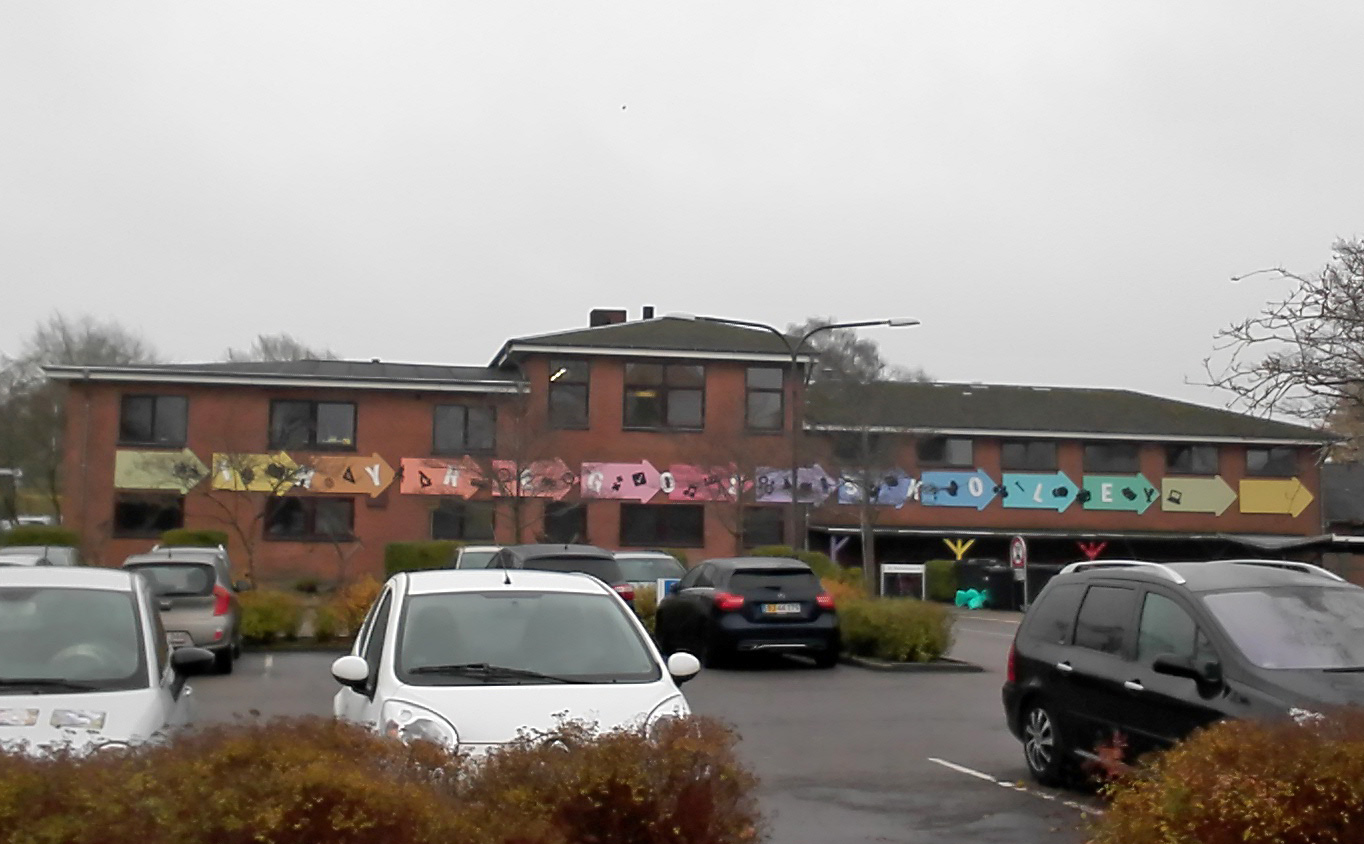
- Thyregod School

- Location within Denmark Location within Region of Southern Denmark
- Coordinates: 55°54′27″N 9°15′33″E
- Country: Denmark
- Region: Southern Denmark
- Municipality: Vejle Municipality

Area
  - Urban: 1.5 km^{2} (0.58 sq mi)

Population (2026)
  - Urban: 1,352
  - Urban density: 900/km^{2} (2,300/sq mi)
- Time zone: UTC+1 (CET)
  - Summer (DST): UTC+2 (CEST)
- Postal code: DK-7323 Give

Thyregod is a railway town, with a population of 1,352 (1 January 2026), in Vejle Municipality, Denmark. It is the northernmost town in Region of Southern Denmark, located 8 km north of Give, 10 km southeast of Brande, 10 km south of Ejstrupholm and 34 km northwest of Vejle.

Thyregod is served by Thyregod railway station on the Vejle–Holstebro railway line.

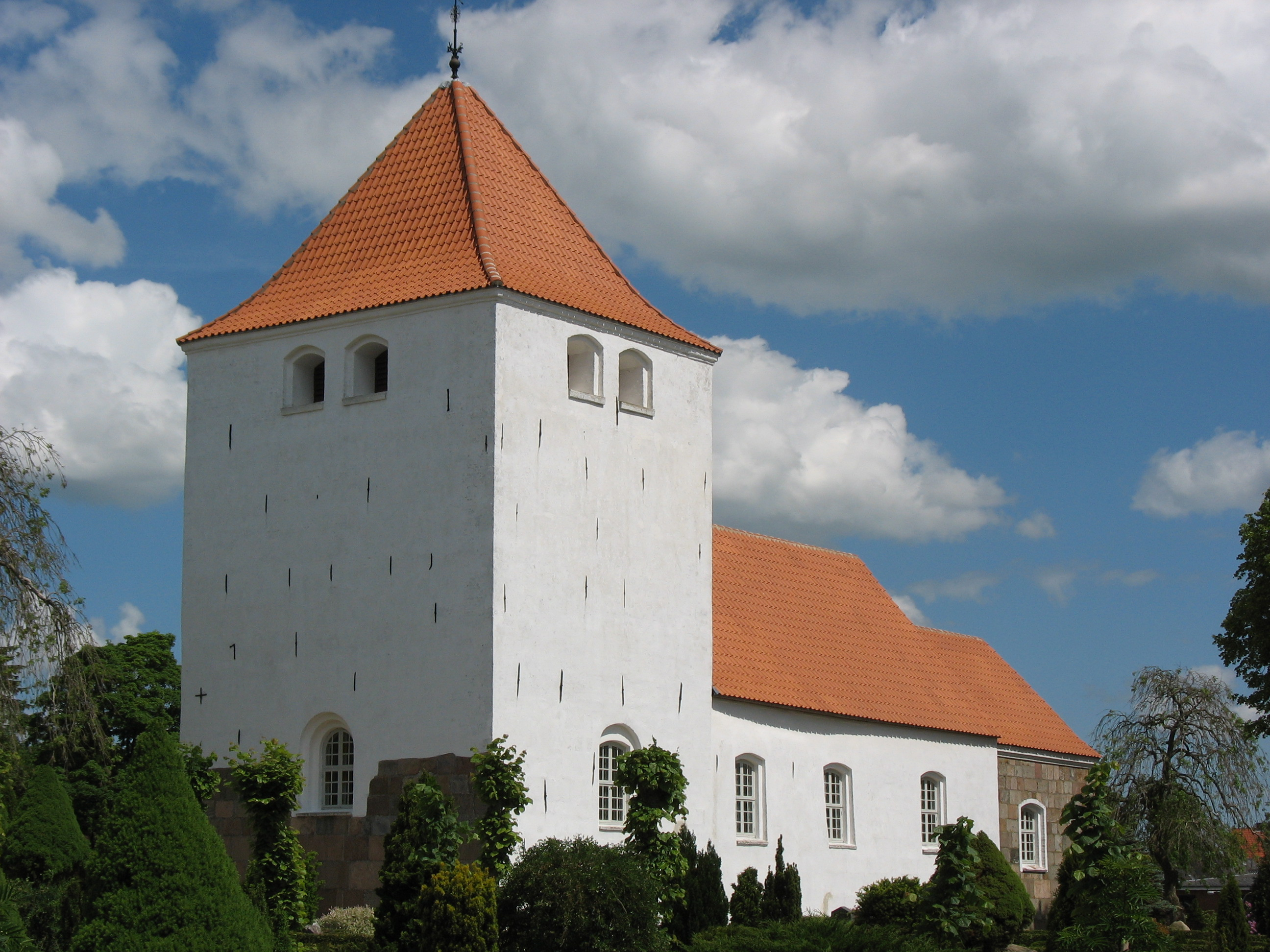
Thyregod Church

Thyregod Church, from the 12th-13th centuries, is located in the town.

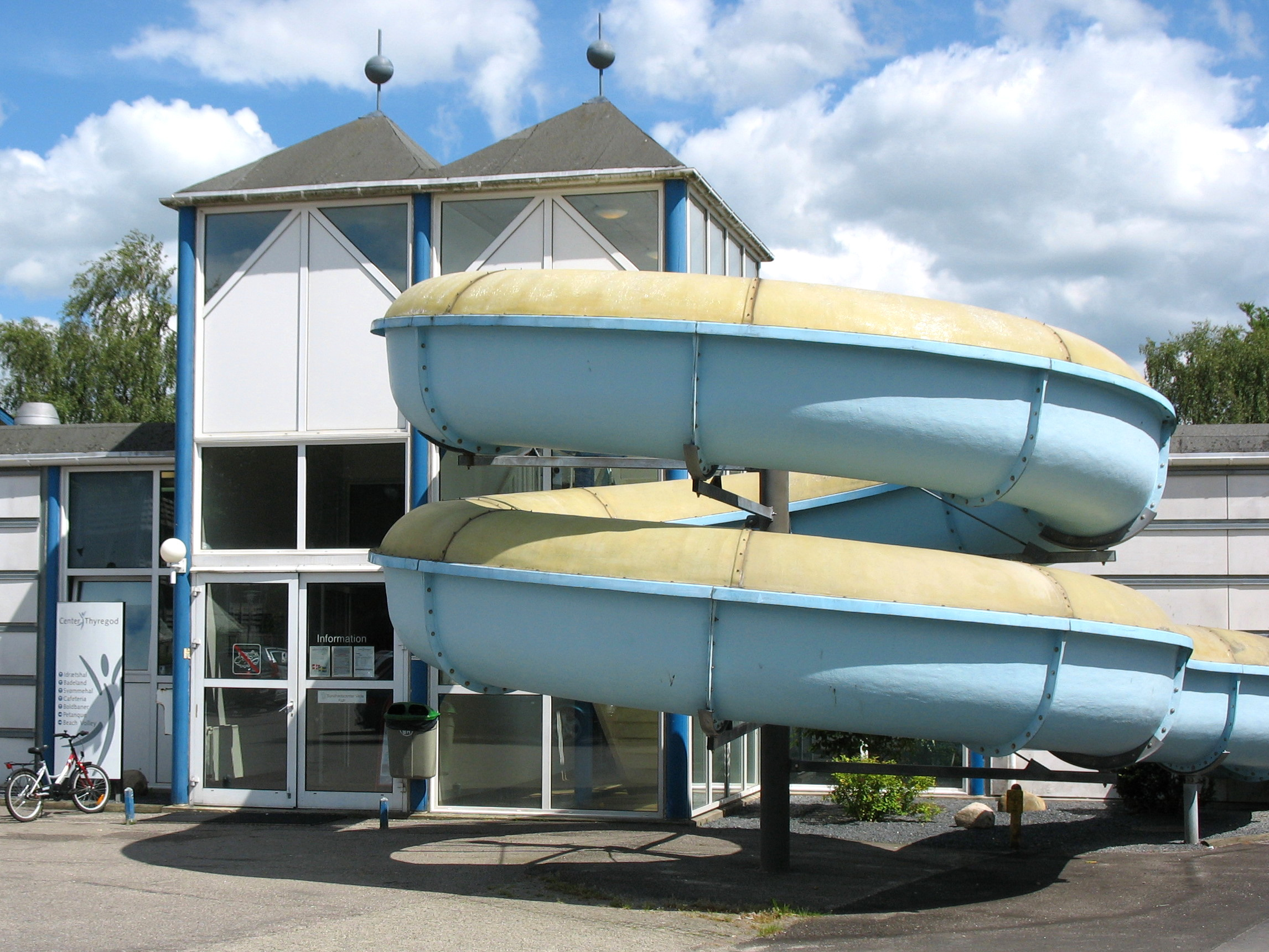
Center Thyregod

Center Thyregod, a swimming centre and waterpark, offers various pools and aquatic facilities.
