= Thyregod railway station =

Railway station in Thyregod, Denmark

Thyregod
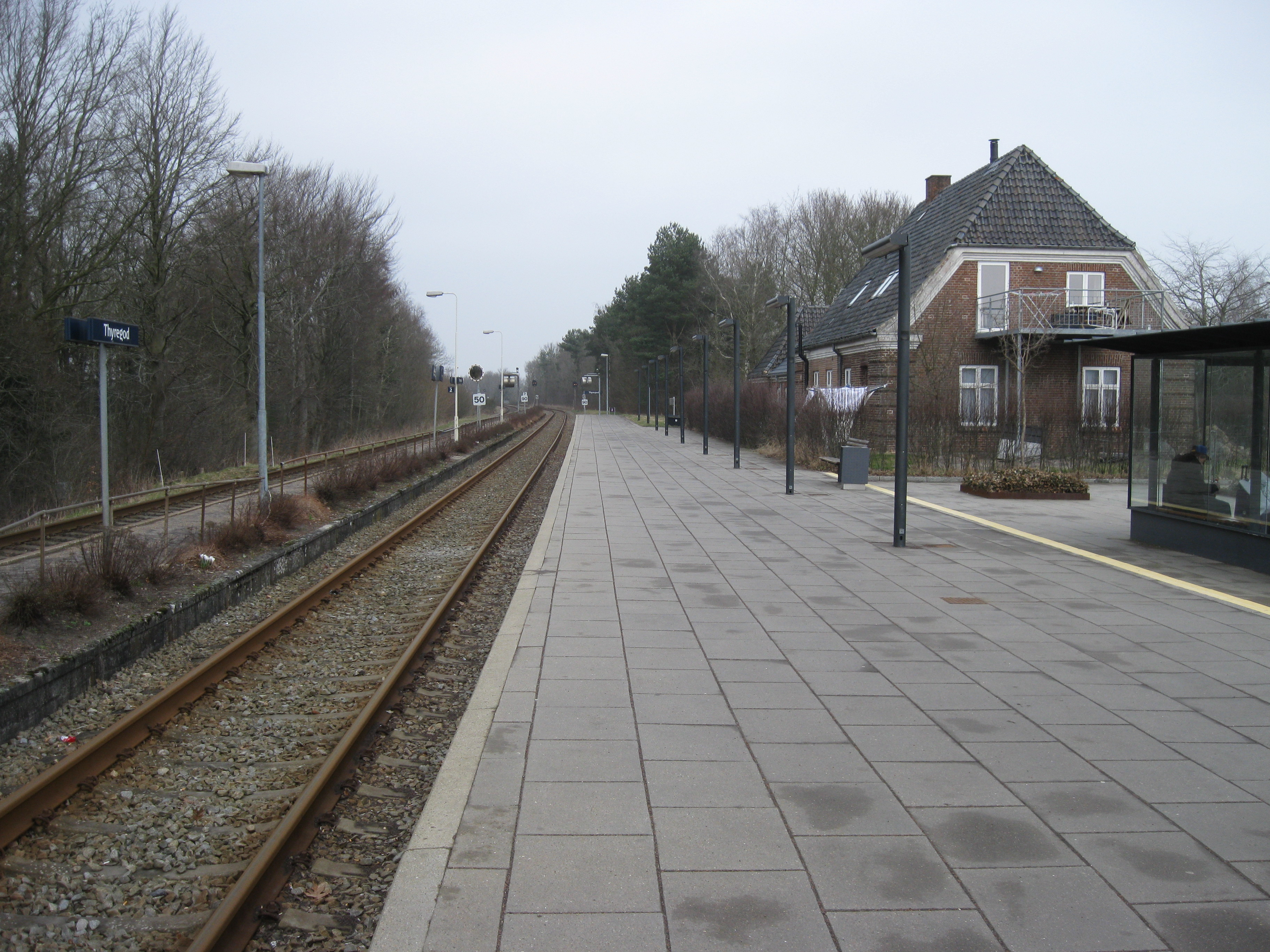
- Thyregod station in 2012

General information
- Location: Vestre Allé 8 Thyregod, 7323 Give; Vejle Municipality; Denmark
- Coordinates: 55°54′29″N 9°15′9″E
- Elevation: 12.4 metres (41 ft)
- Owner: DSB (station infrastructure); Banedanmark (rail infrastructure)
- Line: Vejle-Holstebro Line
- Platforms: 2
- Tracks: 2
- Train operators: DSB; GoCollective

Construction
- Architect: Heinrich Wenck

History
- Opened: 1 January 1914

Services
Preceding station	DSB	Following station
Give towards Copenhagen Airport	Copenhagen-Herning-Struer InterCityLyn	Brande towards Struer
Preceding station	GoCollective	Following station
Give towards Vejle	Vejle–Struer Regional train	Brande towards Struer
Location

Thyregod station is a railway station serving the railway town of Thyregod in Southern Denmark.

Thyregod station is located on the Vejle-Holstebro railway line. The station opened in 1914 with the opening of the Give-Herning section of the Vejle-Holstebro Line. The station building was designed by the Danish architect Heinrich Wenck. The stations offers direct InterCityLyn services to Copenhagen and Struer operated by the railway company DSB as well as regional train services to Vejle, Herning and Struer operated by GoCollective.

== See also ==
- List of railway stations in Denmark
- Rail transport in Denmark
