= Gødstrup railway station =

Railway station in Herning Municipality, Denmark

Gødstrup
- Gødstrup railway station.

General information
- Location: Hospitalsparken; 7400 Gødstrup; Herning Municipality; Denmark
- Coordinates: 56°09′31″N 8°53′37″E
- Elevation: 43.8 metres (144 ft)
- Owner: Banedanmark
- Line: Vejle-Holstebro Line
- Platforms: 1
- Tracks: 1
- Train operators: DSB; GoCollective

Construction
- Architect: Heinrich Wenck (1904)

History
- Opened: 11 October 1904; 15 marts 2021
- Closed: 1969

Services
Preceding station	DSB	Following station
Herning towards Copenhagen Airport	Copenhagen-Herning-Struer InterCityLyn	Vildbjerg towards Struer
Preceding station	GoCollective	Following station
Herning towards Vejle	Vejle–Struer Regional train	Vildbjerg towards Struer
Location

Gødstrup station is a railway station serving the Gødstrup regional hospital in the village of Gødstrup in Jutland, Denmark. The station is located about 200 m from the hospital's main entrance.

Gødstrup station is located on the Vejle-Holstebro railway line. The station originally opened in 1904 with the opening of the Herning-Holstebro section of the Vejle-Holstebro railway line, and was closed in 1969. It was reopened in 2021 to serve the new Gødstrup regional hospital, which opened in 2022. The stations offers direct InterCityLyn services to Copenhagen and Struer operated by the railway company DSB as well as regional train services to Vejle, Aarhus and Struer operated by the public transport company GoCollective.

== History ==
The station originally opened on 11 October 1904 with the opening of the Herning-Holstebro section of the Vejle-Holstebro railway line, and was closed in 1969. The station was reopened on 15 March 2021 to serve the new Gødstrup regional hospital, which opened on 13. februar 2022. The reopened station is located approximately 300 meters from the original Gødstrup Station.

== Operations ==
The stations offers direct InterCityLyn services to Copenhagen and Struer operated by the national railway company DSB as well as regional train services to Vejle, Aarhus and Struer operated by the private public transport company GoCollective. All passenger trains in both directions stop at the station with two stops per hour each way during the day and one per hour in the evening hours.

== Architecture ==
The original station building from 1904 was designed by the Danish architect Heinrich Wenck (1851–1936), known for the numerous railway stations he designed across Denmark in his capacity of head architect of the Danish State Railways. The station building was sold when the station closed in 1969, and still exists as a private residence.

== Facilities ==
The station has a forecourt with bicycle and car parking as well as a bus and taxi stand. In addition, a kiss-and-ride zone has been established with options for disembarking and boarding.

== See also ==
- List of railway stations in Denmark
