= Aulum railway station =

Railway station in Aulum, Denmark

Aulum

General information
- Location: Jernbanegade 2; 7490 Aulum; Herning Municipality; Denmark
- Coordinates: 56°15′38″N 8°47′20″E
- Elevation: 44.1 metres (145 ft)
- Owner: DSB (station infrastructure); Banedanmark (rail infrastructure)
- Line: Vejle–Holstebro
- Platforms: 2
- Tracks: 2
- Train operators: DSB; GoCollective

Other information
- Website: Official website

History
- Opened: 11 October 1904

Services
Preceding station	DSB	Following station
Vildbjerg towards Copenhagen Airport	Copenhagen-Herning-Struer InterCityLyn	Holstebro towards Struer
Preceding station	GoCollective	Following station
Vildbjerg towards Vejle	Vejle–Struer Regional train	Holstebro towards Struer
Location

Aulum station is a railway station serving the railway town of Aulum in Central Jutland, Denmark.

Aulum station is located on the Vejle-Holstebro railway line. The station was opened in 1904 with the opening of the Herning–Holstebro section of the Vejle–Holstebro Line. The station building was designed by the Danish architect Heinrich Wenck. It offers direct InterCityLyn services to Copenhagen operated by the national railway company DSB as well as regional train services to Fredericia, Aarhus and Struer operated by the private public transport operating company GoCollective.

== See also ==
- List of railway stations in Denmark
