= Jelling railway station =

Railway station in Vejle Municipality, Denmark

Jelling
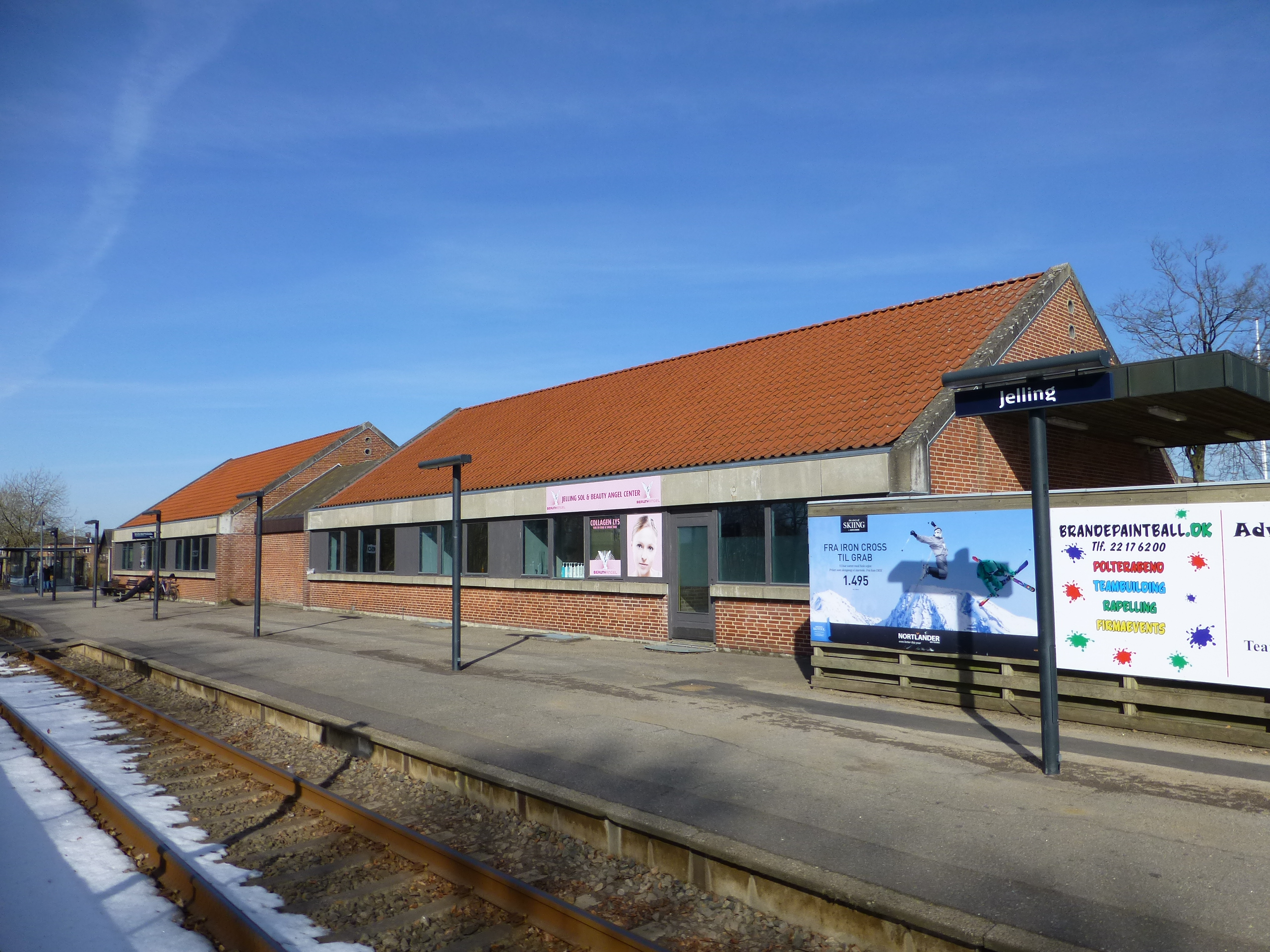
- Jelling station in 2013

General information
- Location: Jernbanevej 3; 7300 Jelling; Vejle Municipality; Denmark
- Coordinates: 55°45′15″N 9°25′13″E
- Elevation: 103.9 metres (341 ft)
- Owner: DSB (station infrastructure); Banedanmark (rail infrastructure)
- Line: Vejle-Holstebro Line
- Platforms: 2
- Tracks: 2
- Train operators: DSB; GoCollective

History
- Opened: 2 August 1894

Services
| Preceding station | DSB | Following station |
|---|---|---|
| Vejle Sygehus towards Copenhagen Airport | Copenhagen-Herning-Struer InterCityLyn | Give towards Struer |
| Preceding station | GoCollective | Following station |
| Vejle Sygehus towards Vejle | Vejle–Struer Regional train | Give towards Struer |
Location

Jelling station is a railway station serving the railway town of Jelling in Jutland, Denmark.

Jelling station is located on the Vejle-Holstebro railway line. The station opened in 1894 with the opening of the Vejle-Give section of the Vejle-Holstebro Line. The current station building was constructed in 1980. The stations offers direct InterCityLyn services to Copenhagen and Struer operated by the railway company DSB as well as regional train services to Vejle, Herning and Struer operated by GoCollective.

== See also ==
- List of railway stations in Denmark
