= Give railway station =

Railway station in Give, Denmark

Give
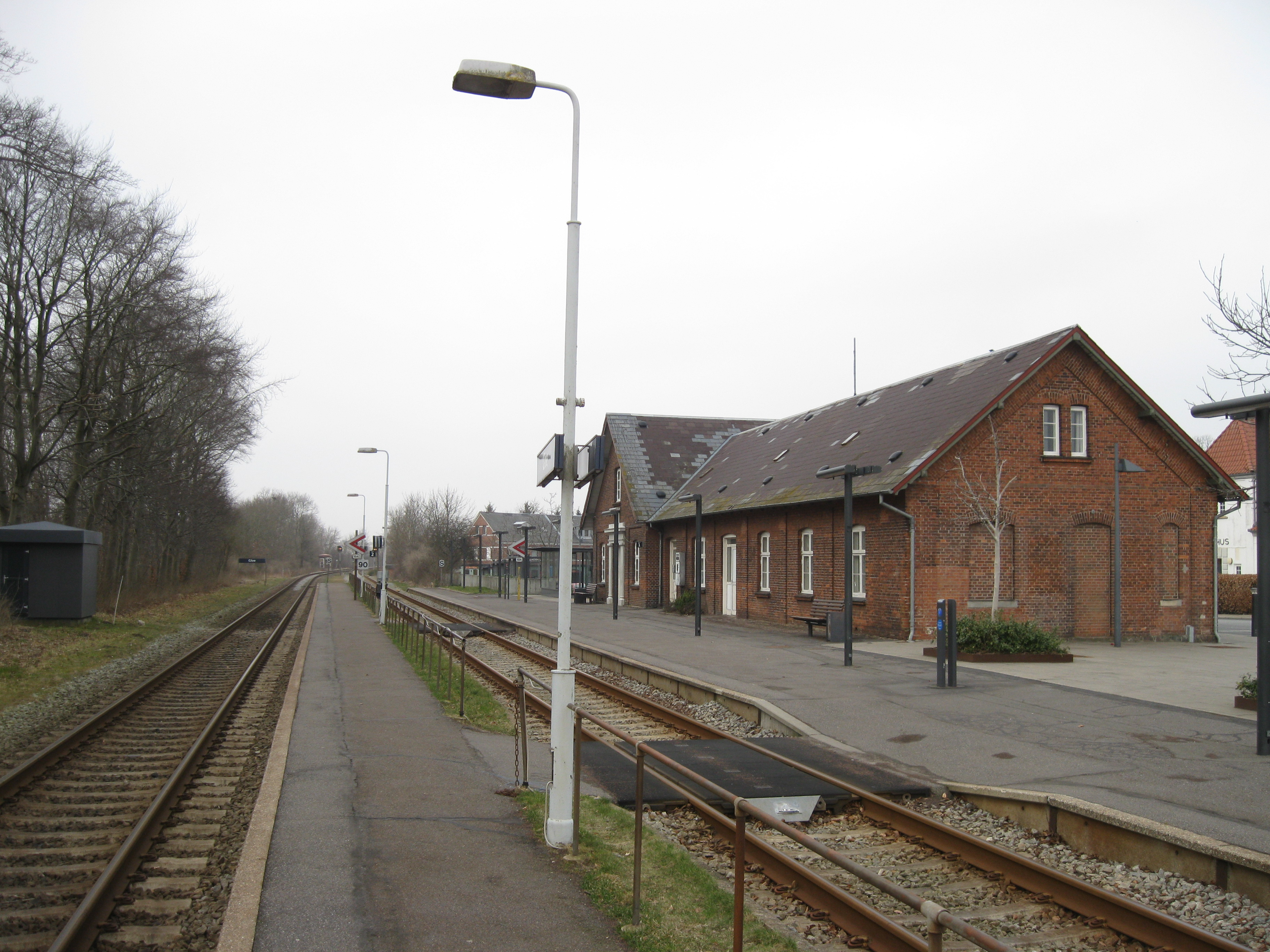
- Give station in 2012

General information
- Location: Allégade 10; 7323 Give; Vejle Municipality; Denmark
- Coordinates: 55°50′35″N 9°14′10″E
- Elevation: 84.2 metres (276 ft)
- Owner: DSB (station infrastructure); Banedanmark (rail infrastructure)
- Line: Vejle-Holstebro Line
- Platforms: 2
- Tracks: 2
- Train operators: DSB; GoCollective

History
- Opened: 2 August 1894

Services
Preceding station	DSB	Following station
Jelling towards Copenhagen Airport	Copenhagen-Herning-Struer InterCityLyn	Thyregod towards Struer
Preceding station	GoCollective	Following station
Jelling towards Vejle	Vejle–Struer Regional train	Thyregod towards Struer
Location

Give station is a railway station serving the railway town of Give in Southern Denmark.

Give station is located on the Vejle-Holstebro railway line. The station opened in 1894 with the opening of the Vejle-Give section of the Vejle-Holstebro Line. The stations offers direct InterCityLyn services to Copenhagen and Struer operated by the railway company DSB as well as regional train services to Vejle, Herning and Struer operated by the private public transport company GoCollective.

== See also ==
- List of railway stations in Denmark
