= Herning railway station =

Railway station in Herning, Denmark

Herning
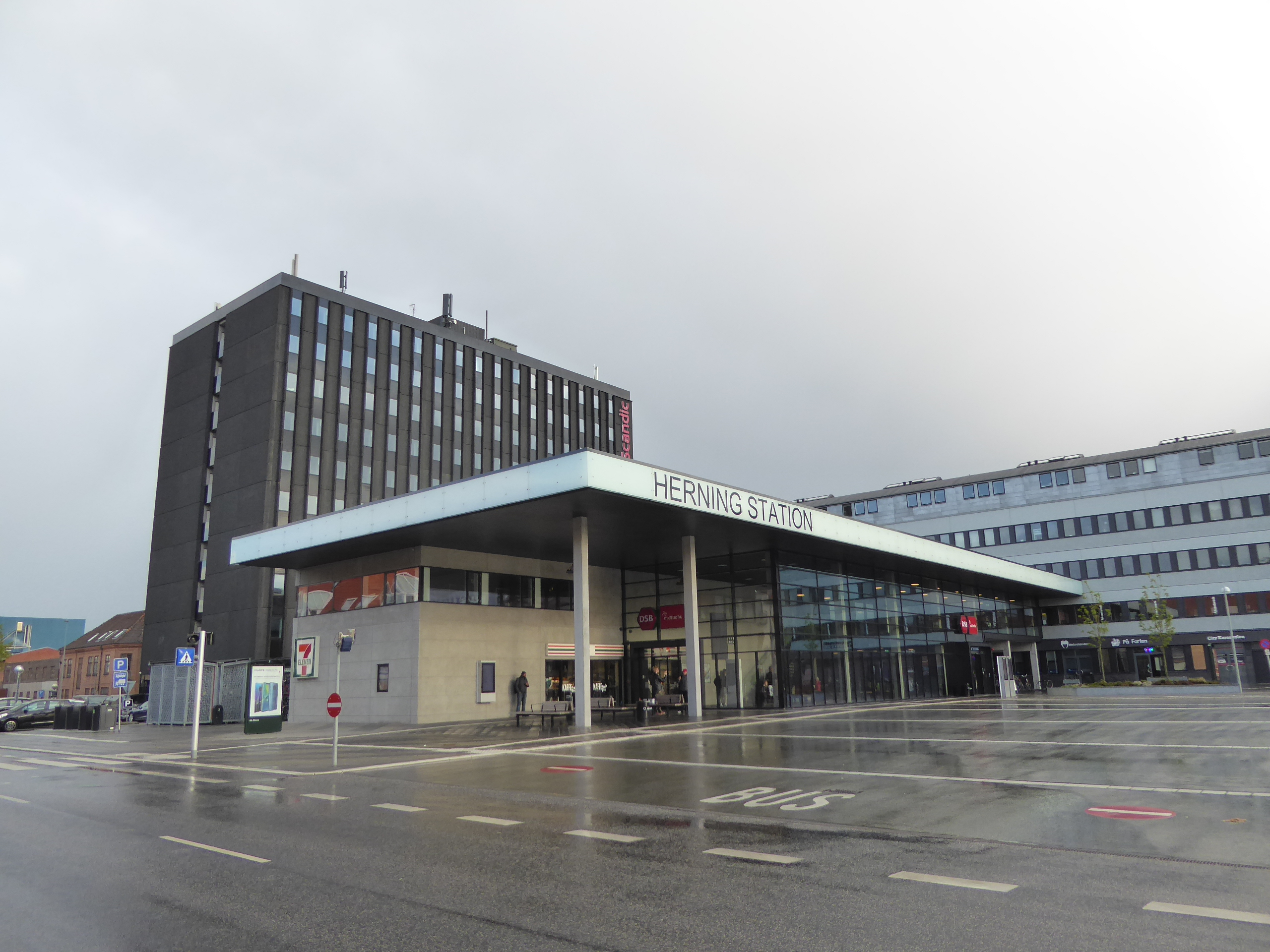
- Herning Station in 2019

General information
- Location: Banegårdsparken 6C; 7400 Herning; Herning Municipality; Denmark
- Coordinates: 56°08′00″N 8°58′41″E
- Elevation: 53.4 metres (175 ft)
- Owner: DSB (station infrastructure); Banedanmark (rail infrastructure)
- Lines: Vejle-Holstebro Line; Skanderborg-Skjern Line; Herning-Viborg Line (closed 1971)
- Platforms: 2
- Tracks: 4
- Train operators: GoCollective; DSB

History
- Opened: 28 August 1877
- Rebuilt: 1906; 28 April 1979

Services
Preceding station	DSB	Following station
Brande towards Copenhagen Airport	Copenhagen-Herning-Struer InterCityLyn	Gødstrup towards Struer
Preceding station	GoCollective	Following station
Brande towards Vejle	Vejle–Struer Regional train	Gødstrup towards Struer
Herning Messecenter towards Skjern	Aarhus–Skjern Regional train	Birk Centerpark towards Aarhus Central
Location

Herning station (Danish: Herning Station or Herning Banegård) is the main railway station serving the city of Herning in Jutland, Denmark.

Herning station is an important railway junction where the Vejle-Holstebro Line and the Skanderborg-Skjern Line cross each other. The station was opened in 1877 with the opening of the Silkeborg-Herning section of the Skanderborg-Skjern Line. It offers direct InterCityLyn services to Copenhagen and Struer operated by DSB as well as regional train services to Aarhus, Vejle, Esbjerg and Thisted operated by GoCollective.

== See also ==
- List of railway stations in Denmark
- Rail transport in Denmark
