= Jelling =

Town in Southern Denmark

- Town
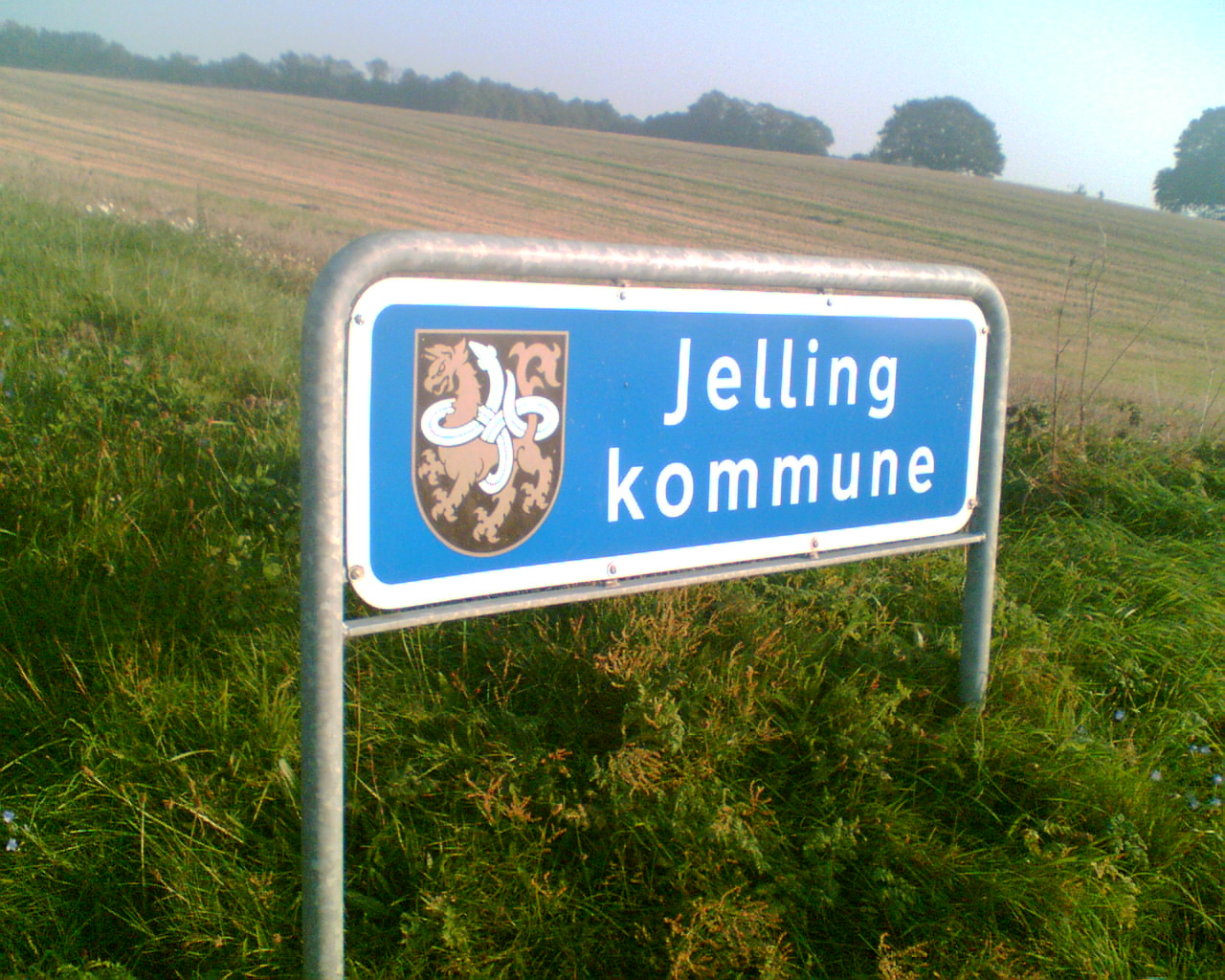
- Former sign of Jelling Municipality

- Location in Denmark Jelling (Region of Southern Denmark)
- Coordinates: 55°45′13″N 09°24′54″E
- Country: Denmark
- Region: Southern Denmark
- Municipality: Vejle
- Established: 956

Area
  - Urban: 3 km^{2} (1.2 sq mi)
- Elevation: 105 m (344 ft)

Population (2026)
  - Urban: 4,038
  - Urban density: 1,300/km^{2} (3,500/sq mi)
  - Gender: 1,931 males and 2,107 females
- Time zone: UTC+1 (CET)
  - Summer (DST): UTC+2 (CEST)
- Postal code: DK-7300

Jelling is a railway town in Denmark with a population of 4,038 (1 January 2026), located in Jelling Parish, approximately 10 km northwest of Vejle. The town lies 105 metres above sea level.

== Location ==
Jelling is located in Vejle municipality and Region of Southern Denmark. The town is mainly famous for the Jelling stones, national monuments. Until the Municipal Reform of 2007 on 1 January 2007, Jelling was the capital of Jelling municipality. Jelling was also the only town in the former Vejle County headquarters for a bank – Jelling Sparekasse, which had its headquarters in the town until 2007 when it merged with Den Jyske Sparekasse, headquartered in Grindsted. Jelling Sparekasse's slogan was: "If king Gorm was alive today ... we would probably be the country's National Bank." One source at least claims that Jelling was the capital of an ancient kingdom of Denmark that was known as Jellund.

== Infrastructure ==
From Jelling it is 56 km to Herning and Silkeborg, 80 km to Aarhus and 10 km to the regional capital Vejle. Jelling is close to the Østjyske Motorvej – (E45) and Midtjyske Motorvej – (Primary Route 18). Jelling is served by Jelling railway station, located on the Vejle–Holstebro railway line. The stations offers direct InterCityLyn services to Copenhagen and Struer operated by the railway company DSB as well as regional train services to Vejle, Herning and Struer operated by Arriva.

In 2003 Jelling municipality was the first municipality in Denmark to offer its residents wireless Internet connection, up to 4 Mbit broadband, at a distance of up to 10 km from Jelling.

== Town centre ==
Vejle municipality has executed a reconstruction project in the village centre. The main road, Gormsgade, was closed and a new bypass constructed, leaving space for the monument area of Jelling.

The plan was estimated to cost in the neighbourhood of 250 million DKK (33,5 million €) which included financing allocated by The State of Denmark, Vejle municipality, Haderslev Diocese and other private foundations, among them "AP Møller and Chastine Mc-Kinney Møller Foundation for General Purposes" – which has donated 70 million DKK (10 million €) for the project.

A new culture house and city square was built as additions to the modern village life, while houses were demolished elsewhere to make space for the monument area. Some houses of historical value were preserved in the museum of Den Gamle By in Aarhus.

== History ==
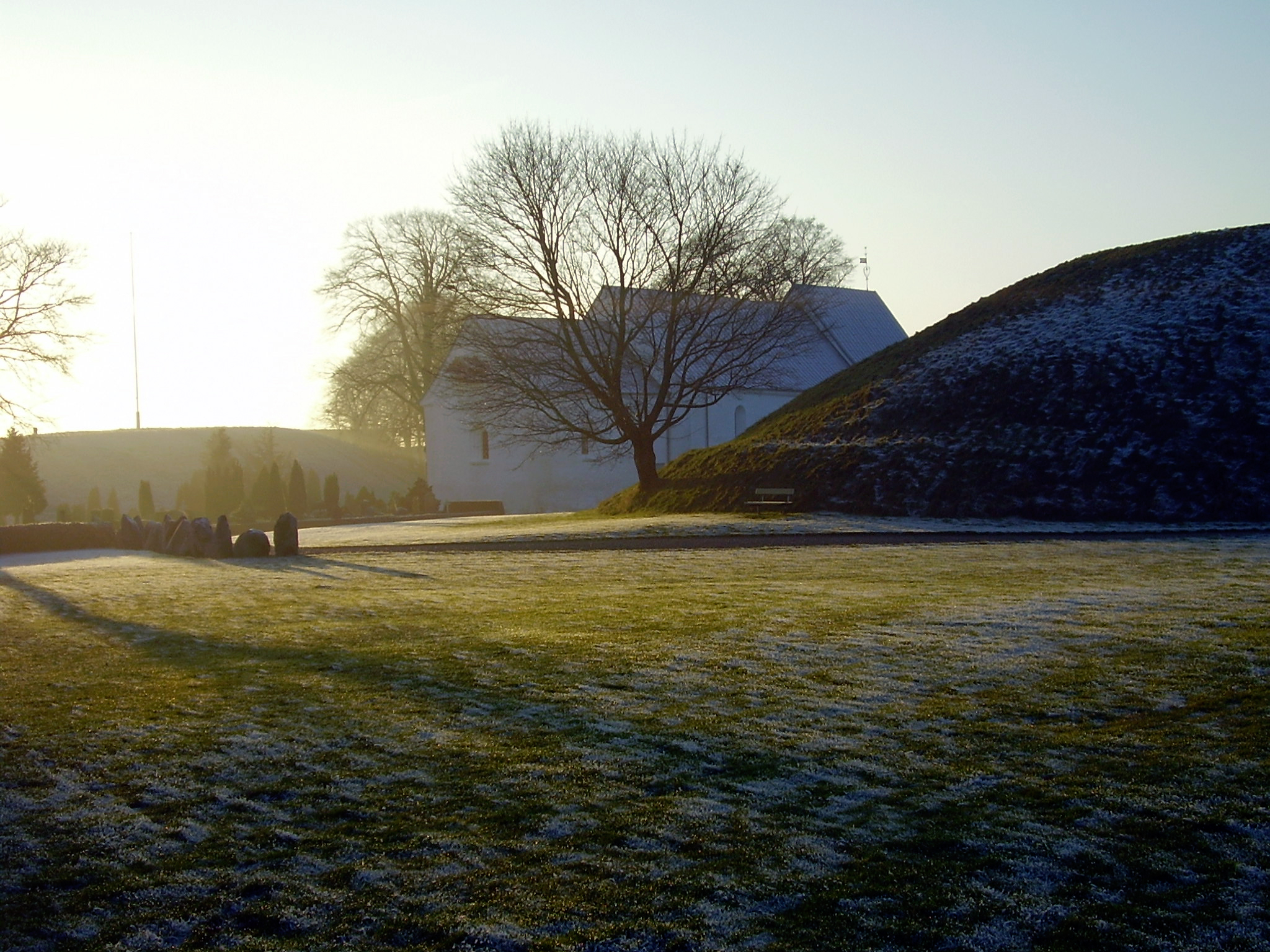
Jelling church and Viking Age burial mounds

Jelling is an old and important historical town in the history of Denmark. In the Viking Age it served as the royal seat of the first Monarchs of the Kingdom of Denmark, including Gorm the Old, Þyra and Harald Bluetooth. Jelling is the site of a large stone ship and two large burial mounds, the Jelling stones, and Jelling Church. They have been UNESCO World Heritage Sites since 1994.

In the North Mound, built between 958 and 959 CE (possibly for King Gorm of Denmark), an empty burial chamber was found. The South Mound was built around 970 and contains no burial. Beneath the two mounds is a large stone ship from around the end of the 9th century. Between the two mounds stand two rune stones, the Jelling stones. Near the stones, Gorm's son King Harald Bluetooth built a wooden church (965), and beneath it re-interred (965–966) the remains of his father.

== Local culture ==
The Jelling Music Festival is held annually and is currently Denmark's third largest festival. Bredagerskolen (situated in Jelling) is the largest school in Vejle municipality. The school currently has 810 students (2009) divided into 0–9 classes over 2–5 traces. The village houses the CVU Lillebælt, which trains teachers and educators. There are three grocery stores in Jelling, two gas stations, three garages, two banks, two breweries, and some other stores. The newly opened town house is to house Borgerservice, a library, a cinema, a café, and one of the two breweries.

== Notable people ==
- Gorm the Old (900-958) ruler of Denmark, reigning from c.936 to his death c.958; he ruled from Jelling, and made the oldest of the Jelling Stones
- Nielsine Paget (1858 in Jelling – 1932) a New Zealand homemaker and community worker
