= Farre, Vejle Municipality =

Danish village

Farre
- Village
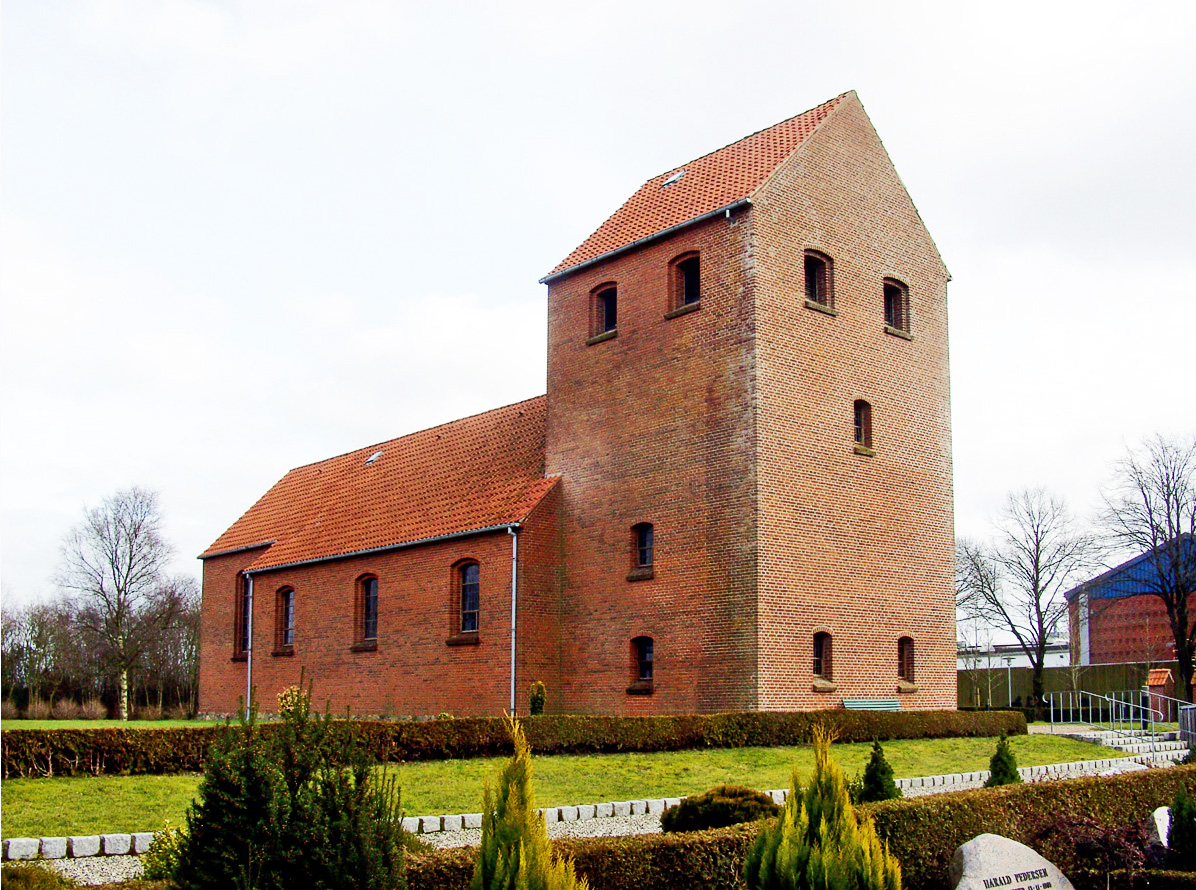
- Farre Church

- Location in Region of Southern Denmark Farre (Denmark)
- Coordinates: 55°48′13″N 9°15′11″E
- Country: Denmark
- Region: Southern Denmark
- Municipality: Vejle Municipality

Population (2026)
  - Total: 343
- Postal code: DK-7323 Give

Farre is a small village, with a population of 343 (as of 1 January 2026), in Vejle Municipality, Region of Southern Denmark in Denmark. It is located 5 km south of Give.

Farre Church is located on the northern outskirts of the village.

Like many other small villages Farre has lost a lot of its institutions and shops during the recent years. Today it is a village without a school and grocery shops. However the headquarters of the chicken producer Danpo A/S and the whiskeydistillery Fary Lochan, founded in 2009, are located in the village.
