= Vildbjerg railway station =

Railway station in Vildbjerg, Denmark

Vildbjerg
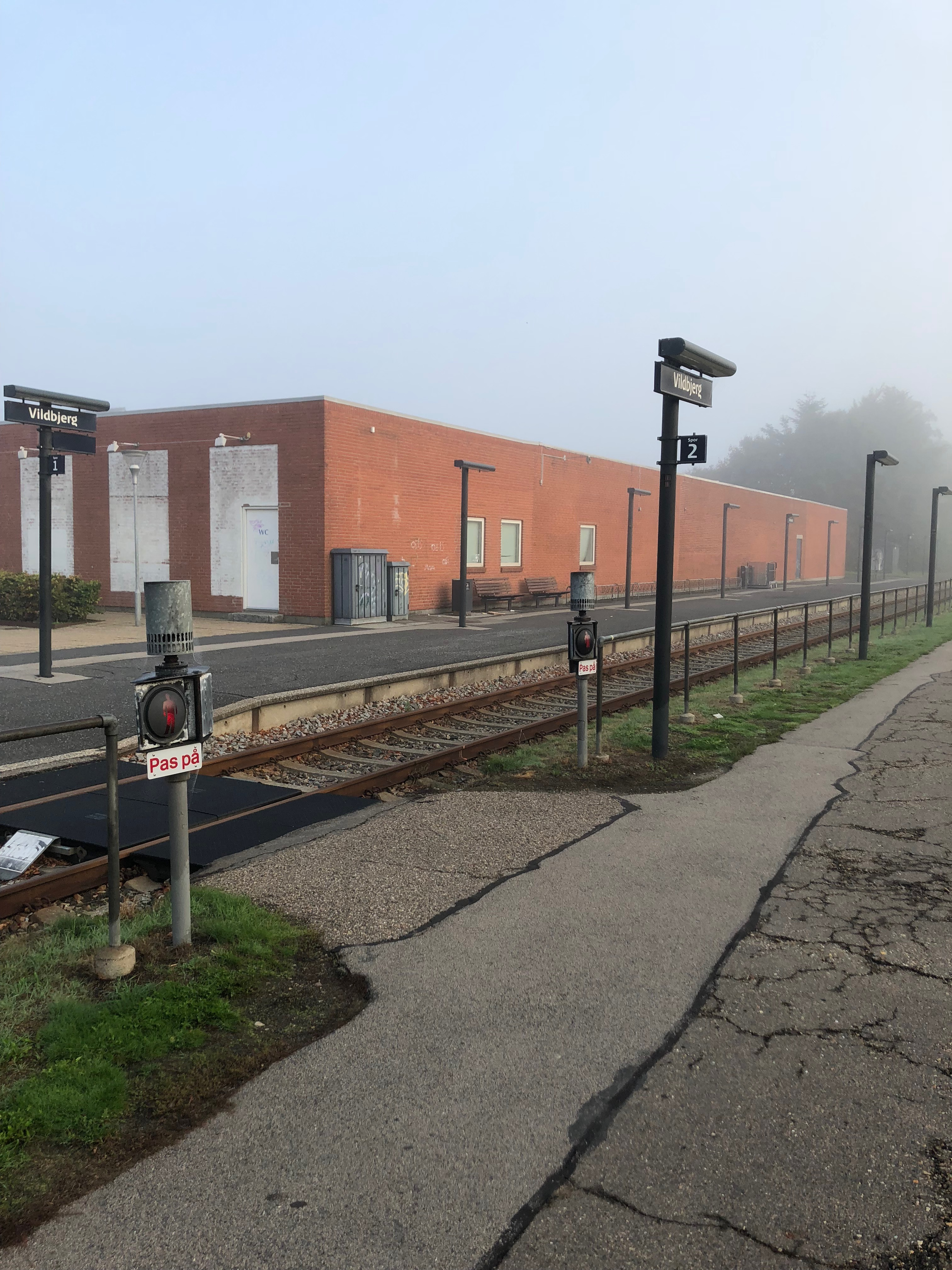
- Vildbjerg Station in 2018

General information
- Location: Jernbane Allé; 7480 Vildbjerg; Herning Municipality; Denmark
- Coordinates: 56°11′53″N 8°46′07″E
- Elevation: 51.2 metres (168 ft)
- Owner: DSB (station infrastructure); Banedanmark (rail infrastructure)
- Line: Vejle-Holstebro Line
- Platforms: 2
- Tracks: 2
- Train operators: DSB; GoCollective

History
- Opened: 11 October 1904

Services
Preceding station	DSB	Following station
Gødstrup towards Copenhagen Airport	Copenhagen-Herning-Struer InterCityLyn	Aulum towards Struer
Preceding station	GoCollective	Following station
Gødstrup towards Vejle	Vejle–Struer Regional train	Aulum towards Struer
Location

Vildbjerg station is a railway station serving the railway town of Vildbjerg in Jutland, Denmark.

Vildbjerg station is located on the Vejle-Holstebro railway line. The station was opened in 1904 with the opening of the Herning-Holstebro section of the Vejle-Holstebro Line. It offers direct InterCityLyn services to Copenhagen and Struer operated by the national railway company DSB as well as regional train services to Fredericia, Aarhus and Struer operated by the private public transport operating company GoCollective.

== See also ==
- List of railway stations in Denmark
- Rail transport in Denmark
