= Brande railway station =

Railway station in Ikast-Brande Municipality, Denmark

Brande
- Brande station in 2026

General information
- Location: Stationsvej 1; 7330 Brande; Ikast-Brande Municipality; Denmark
- Coordinates: 55°56′40.52″N 9°7′48.50″E
- Elevation: 49.5 metres (162 ft)
- Owner: DSB (station infrastructure); Banedanmark (rail infrastructure)
- Operator: DSB; GoCollective
- Lines: Vejle–Holstebro; Langå–Bramming (closed 1989)
- Platforms: 2
- Tracks: 2
- Train operators: DSB; GoCollective

Construction
- Architect: Heinrich Wenck

Other information
- Website: Official website

History
- Opened: 1 January 1914

Services
Preceding station	DSB	Following station
Thyregod towards Copenhagen Airport	Copenhagen-Herning-Struer InterCityLyn	Herning towards Struer
Preceding station	GoCollective	Following station
Thyregod towards Vejle	Vejle–Struer Regional train	Herning towards Struer
Location

Brande station is a railway station serving the railway town of Brande in Central Jutland, Denmark.

Brande station is located on the Vejle-Holstebro railway line. The station opened in 1914 with the opening of the Give-Herning section of the Vejle-Holstebro Line. The station building was designed by the Danish architect Heinrich Wenck. The stations offers direct InterCityLyn services to Copenhagen and Struer operated by the national railway company DSB as well as regional train services to Vejle, Herning and Struer operated by the private public transport company GoCollective.

== See also ==
- List of railway stations in Denmark
