= Vildbjerg =

- Town
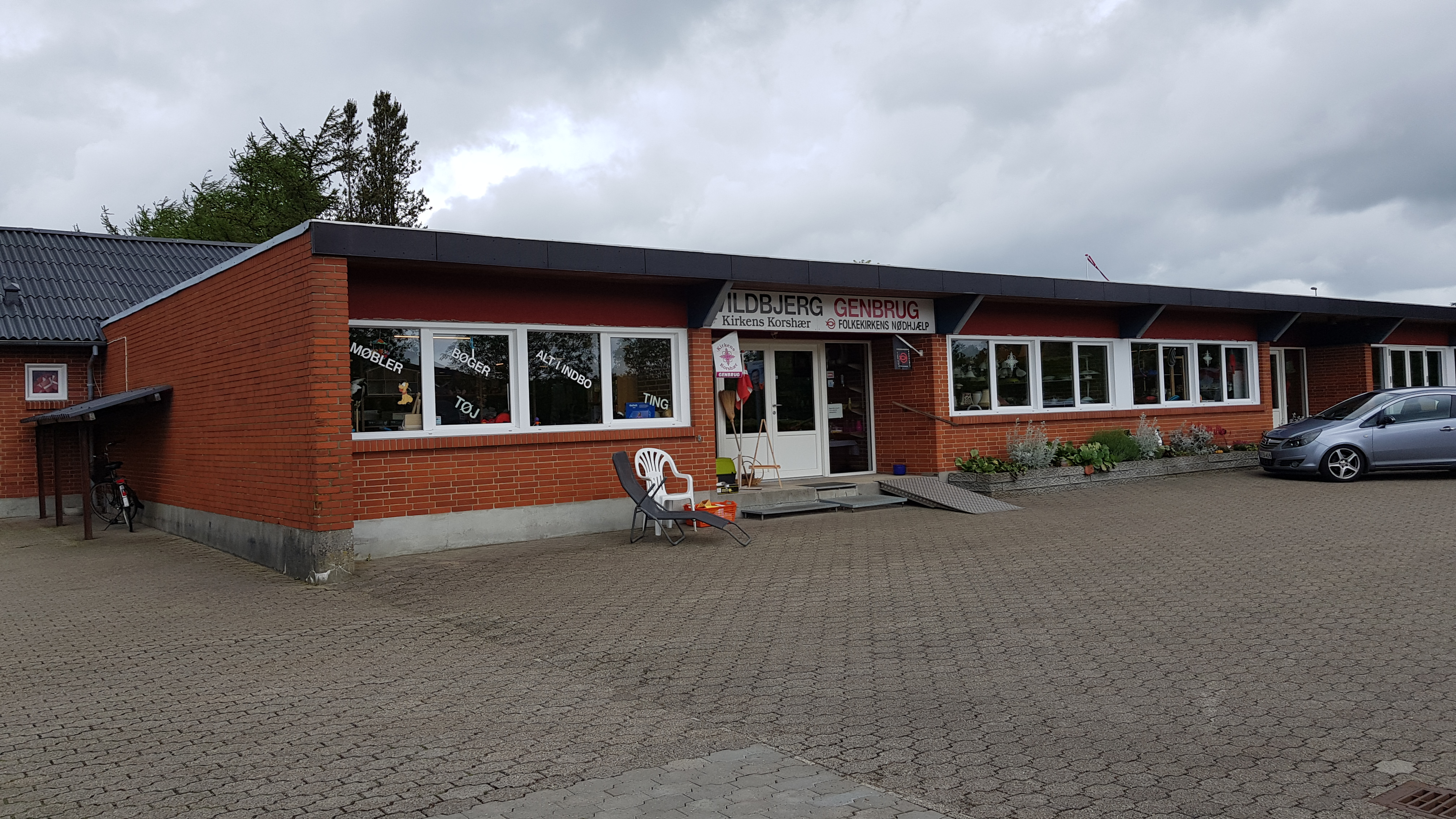
- Vildbjerg second hand shop

- Location within Denmark Location within Central Denmark Region
- Coordinates: 56.196501°N 8.7676960°E
- Country: Denmark
- Region: Central Denmark (Midtjylland)
- Municipality: Herning

Area
  - Urban: 3.9 km^{2} (1.5 sq mi)

Population (2026-01-01)
  - Urban: 4,169
  - Urban density: 1,100/km^{2} (2,800/sq mi)
  - Gender: 2,046 males and 2,123 females
- Time zone: UTC+1 (CET)
  - Summer (DST): UTC+2 (CEST)
- Postal code: DK-7480 Vildbjerg

Vildbjerg is a railway town with a population of 4,169 (1 January 2026), in Herning Municipality, Central Denmark Region in Denmark. It is situated 14.6 km northwest of Herning and is served by Vildbjerg railway station.

Vildbjerg was the municipal seat of the former Trehøje Municipality until 1 January 2007.

The town is known as the host town for Vildbjerg Cup, an international youth football (soccer) tournament for boys and girls between 7 and 17 years old, organized by the local club Vildbjerg SF.

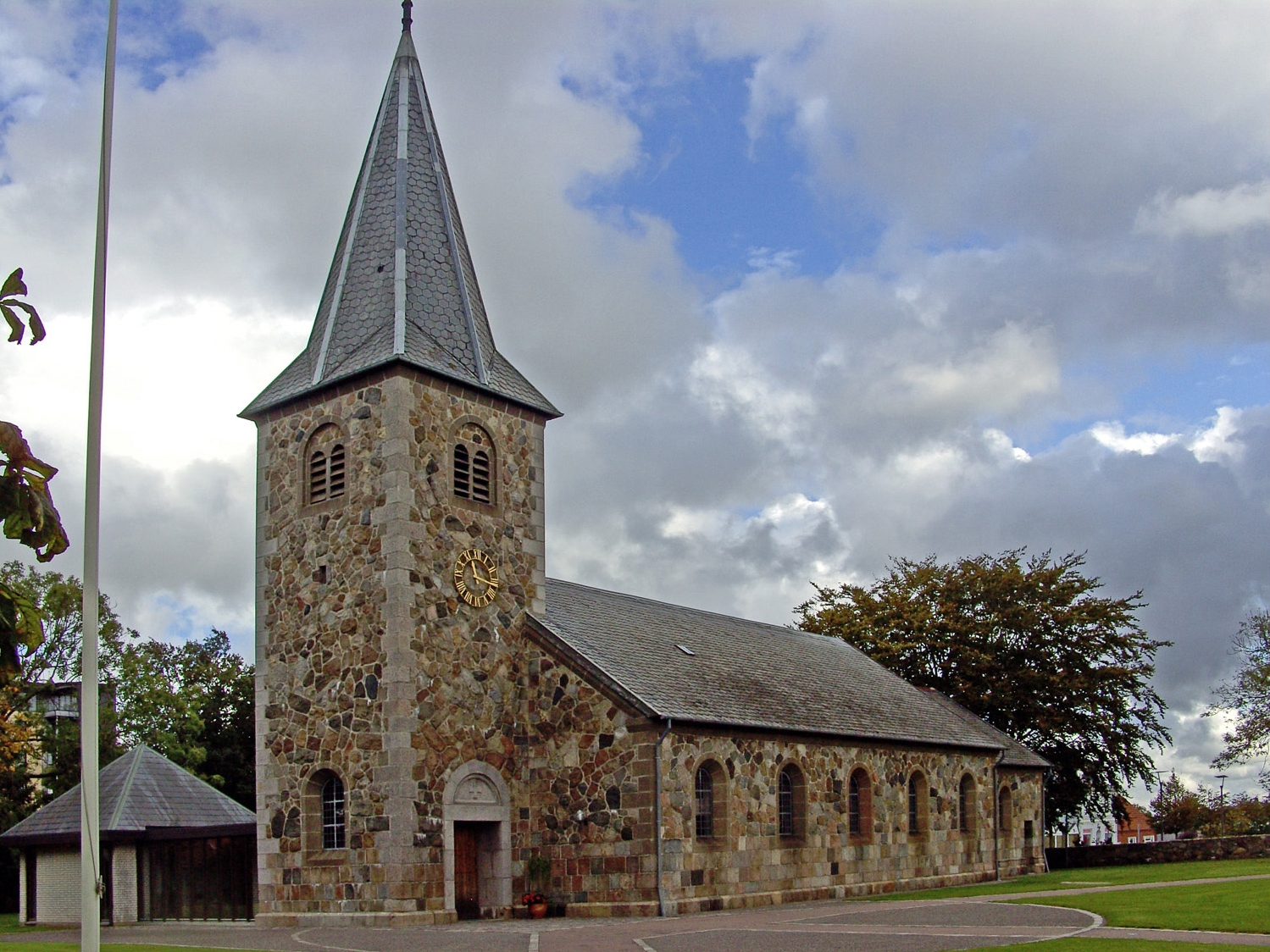
Vildbjerg Church

Vildbjerg Church was built in 1905 on the remnants of a 12-century church.

Vildbjerg School is a public school (Danish: folkeskole) in Vildbjerg. It was built in the period 2005-2006 and was the first primary school in Denmark to be built in a Public-Private-Partnership.

== Notable people ==
- Henrik Risom (born 1968), a Danish former footballer
- Gudmund Hatt (1884–1960) a Danish archaeologist and cultural geographer
