= Bjarne Tromborg =

Danish physicist (born 1940)

Bjarne Tromborg (born 1940) was a Danish physicist, best known for his work in particle physics and photonics. Bjarne died on June 11th 2025 after a brief illness. He is survived by his beloved wife, Ellen Marie, his daughter Marianne, and their grandchildren Natasha, Silvia, and Emilia.

== Biography ==
Tromborg was born in Give, Denmark. In 1968, he received the M.Sc. degree in physics and mathematics from the Niels Bohr Institute, in Copenhagen, Denmark. He was a university researcher studying high-energy particle physics from 1968 to 1978. In 1979, he joined the research laboratory of the Danish Teleadministrations in Copenhagen. He was Head of Optical Communications Department at Tele Danmark Research, Horsholm, Denmark from 1987 to 1995.

He was an adjunct professor at the Niels Bohr Institute from 1991 to 2001. In 1997, he took a leave of absence at the Technion - Israel Institute of Technology. Until his retirement at the end June 2006, he was a research professor at COM•DTU, Department of Communications, Optics and Materials (which became DTU Fotonik, Department of Photonics Engineering, in 2008 and DTU Electro, Department of Electrical and Photonics Engineering, in 2022), Technical University of Denmark.

== Research ==
Tromborg co-authored a research monograph and approximately one hundred journal and conference publications, mostly on physics and optoelectronics.

At the Niels Bohr Institute, he carried out research in elementary particle physics, particularly analytic S-matrix theory and electromagnetic corrections to hadron scattering. He coauthored a research monograph on dispersion theory.

In the early 1980s, he switched to photonics. Tromborg was one of the first to develop advanced theoretical models for complex semiconductor laser structures such as external laser cavities and distributed feedback lasers in the beginning of the 1980s. Computer simulations and measurements confirmed the validity of the theoretical models and their predictions. Several co-workers including Henning Olesen, Gunnar Jacobsen, Jens Henrik Osmundsen, Finn Mogensen, Kristian Stubkjær, Jesper Mørk, Xing Pan, Hans Erik Lassen and Björn Jónsson contributed to this work over a period of almost 15 years until 1995.

At TeleDanmark Research in the late 1980s and early 1990s Tromborg and colleagues worked to study the dynamics of active semiconductor materials in order to understand the physical relaxation processes at play, their strength and characteristic time scales. A pump-probe set-up employing femtosecond lasers was established and modeling efforts were initialized. Tromborg led the effort to identify this as a topic that would remain important for many years and argued that Denmark should work to lead in the field. He also proposed theoretical methods that could be used to estimate the size of these ultrafast dynamical effects and their role in understanding the origin of nonlinear gain suppression in semiconductor lasers.

From 1999 to his retirement at the end of June 2006, Tromborg was with the Department of Communications, Optics and Materials (COM*DTU) at the Technical University of Denmark. In this period, he worked in both research and education, as well as in securing several European Union research projects for COM*DTU. Tromborg took up the field of photonic crystals and initiated and contributed himself to activities within the theory of photonic crystals. He also applied general techniques within stochastic theory and signal analysis to develop improved descriptions of noise spectra in nonlinear semiconductor optical amplifiers.

== Awards and recognition ==
Tromborg received the Electro-prize from the Danish Society of Engineers in 1981.

He was chairman of the Danish Optical Society from 1999 to 2002.

He was associate editor of the IEEE Journal of Quantum Electronics beginning in 2003.

At his retirement, a symposium on photonics was held in his honor on 22 June 2006 at the Technical University of Denmark.
