= Vejle Sygehus railway halt =

Railway station in Vejle Municipality, Denmark

Vejle Sygehus
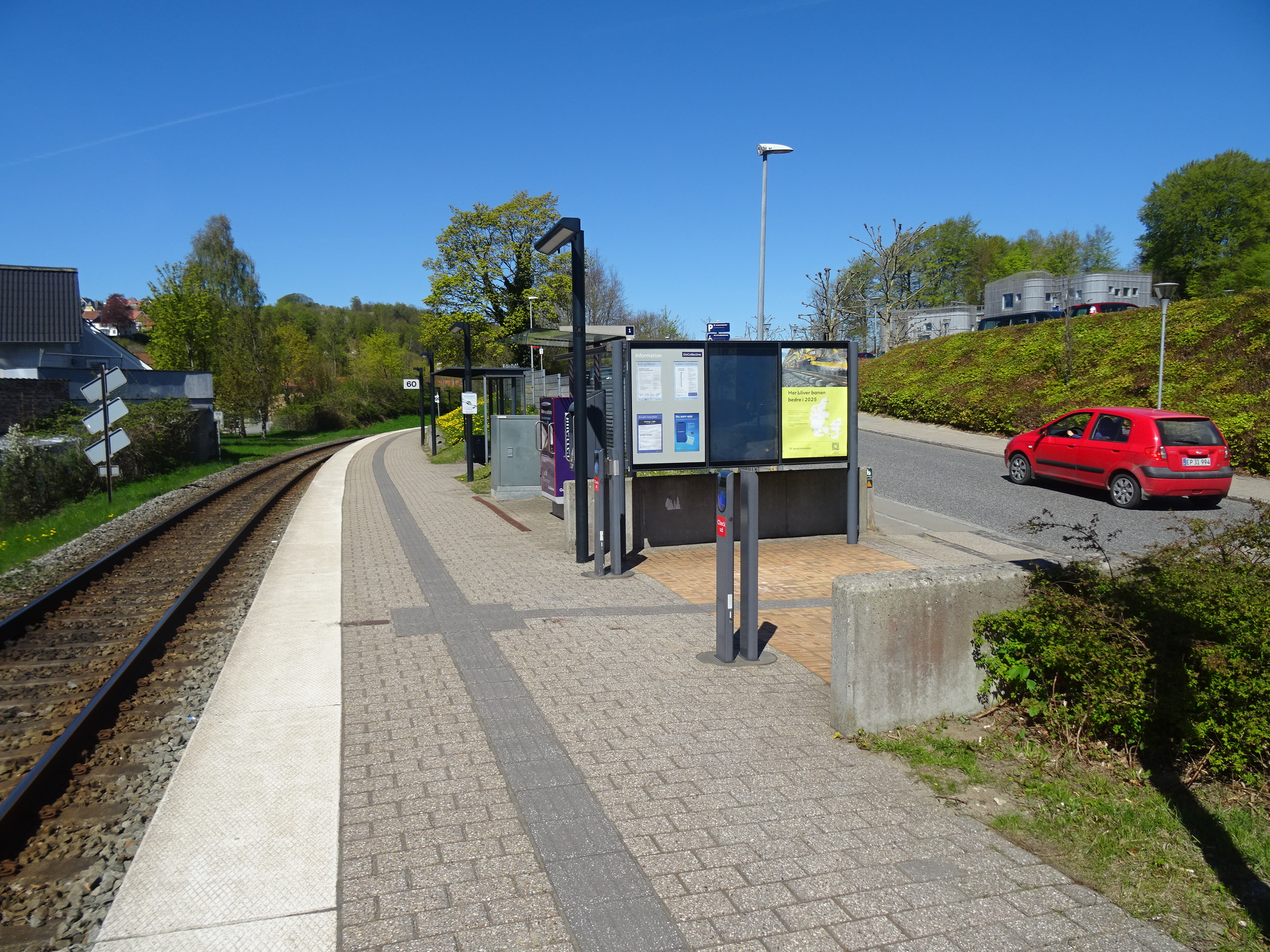
- Vejle Sygehus railway halt in 2026

General information
- Location: Beriderbakken 1; 7100 Vejle; Vejle Municipality; Denmark
- Coordinates: 55°42′54″N 9°32′13″E
- Elevation: 5.9 metres (19 ft)
- Owner: Banedanmark
- Line: Vejle-Holstebro Line
- Platforms: 1
- Tracks: 1
- Train operators: DSB; GoCollective

History
- Opened: 1993

Services
Preceding station	DSB	Following station
Vejle towards Copenhagen Airport	Copenhagen-Herning-Struer InterCityLyn	Jelling towards Struer
Preceding station	DSB Vores Tog	Following station
Vejle Terminus	Vejle–Struer Regional train	Jelling towards Struer
Location

Vejle Sygehus railway halt is a railway halt serving the northern part of the city of Vejle in Jutland, Denmark, as well as the nearby hospital Vejle Sygehus.

Vejle Sygehus railway halt is located on the Vejle–Holstebro railway line. The station opened in 1993 to serve the adjacent hospital Vejle Sygehus. The station offers direct InterCityLyn services to Copenhagen and Struer operated by the railway company DSB as well as regional train services to Vejle, Herning and Struer operated by GoCollective.

== See also ==
- List of railway stations in Denmark
