= Torben Chris =

Danish stand-up comedian (born 1977)

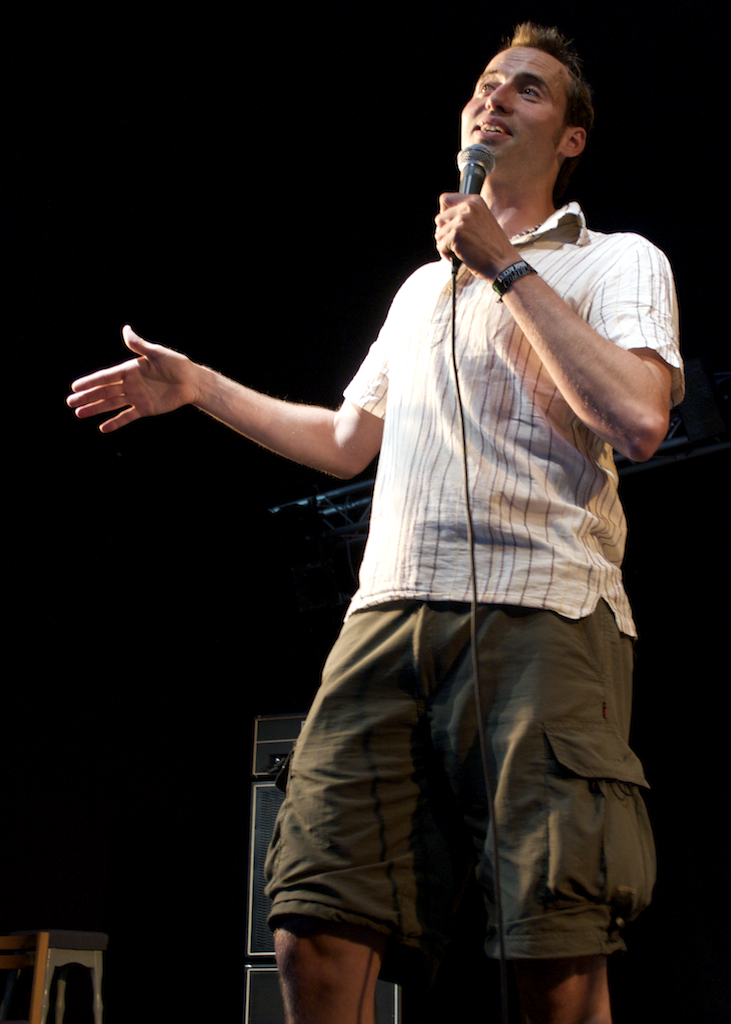
- Chris at Nibe Festival in 2009
- Born: Torben Chris Nielsen; 13 February 1977 (age 48); Give, Denmark
- Occupation: Stand-up comedian
- Website: torbenchris.dk

Torben Chris Nielsen (born 13 February 1977) is a Danish standup comedian. Media attention towards him began to surface during various events such as the DM in stand-up 2003 Comedy Fight Club on TV 2 Zulu and host of Comedy Zoo.

== Career ==
In 2003 he qualified for the semifinals of the championship in stand-up with his 12th show ever. The following year he made it to 4th place, and while Torben Chris completed his teacher training at Jelling College, he played on with stand-up. In 2005 he gave two shows at that year's Jelling Music Festival after winning a talent competition at Vejle Local Radio. In 2006, Torben Chris was placed at number 3 at DM in stand-up and has since appeared several times on Comedy Zoo, Kulcaféen, numerous danish venues and clubs around the country as well as at major international festivals. In 2006 he made a mini-tour with Linda P and Karsten Green with the ironic title Os from TV. In addition, he was part of Telia Comedy Tour January '07 and TV2 Zulu Comedy Fight Club in autumn 2007.

He has appeared in Comedy Aid in 2011 and 2012. Along with Thomas Hartmann, he made the show Men's Room in 2011. The following year, Hartmann and Chris show up with Men's Room 2.

Torben Chris and Thomas Hartmann hosting the Comedy Aid 2014. In 2015 he starred in TV3's reality show I am a celebrity – get me out of here!

== Controversy ==
In December 2015 Chris put a picture of himself and his 2-year-old daughter in a bathtub together on Facebook. This resulted in a widely reported controversy by various media outlets, many of whose analysts thought that nudity or naturism between a father and a daughter is inappropriate. Chris responded by saying that "Children and adults are allowed to be naked together. If we could not bear to see each other naked, we would feed / be born with clothes on (...). Nakedness with your child is not disgusting, but natural". The incident would resurface in subsequent moments and stories about similarly clothless fathers. Torben Chris subsequently stated that one of his motivations for his actions were to confront what he views as widespread prudishness surrounding the human body in Danish society.
