= Vejle–Holstebro railway line =

Railway line in Jutland, Denmark

Vejle–Holstebro line
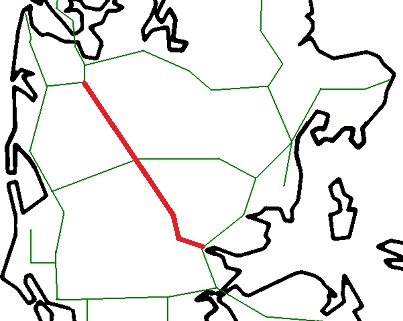

Overview
- Native name: Vejle-Holstebro-banen
- Owner: Banedanmark
- Termini: Vejle station; Holstebro station
- Stations: 11

Service
- Type: Railway
- System: Danish railway
- Operator(s): Arriva; DSB

History
- Opened: Vejle–Give: 21 July 1863; Give–Herning: 1 October 1914; Herning–Struer: 11 October 1904

Technical
- Line length: 114.0 kilometres (70.8 mi)
- Number of tracks: Single
- Character: Passenger trains Freight trains
- Track gauge: 1,435 mm (4 ft 8 1/2 in)
- Electrification: None
- Operating speed: 120 km/h
Route map
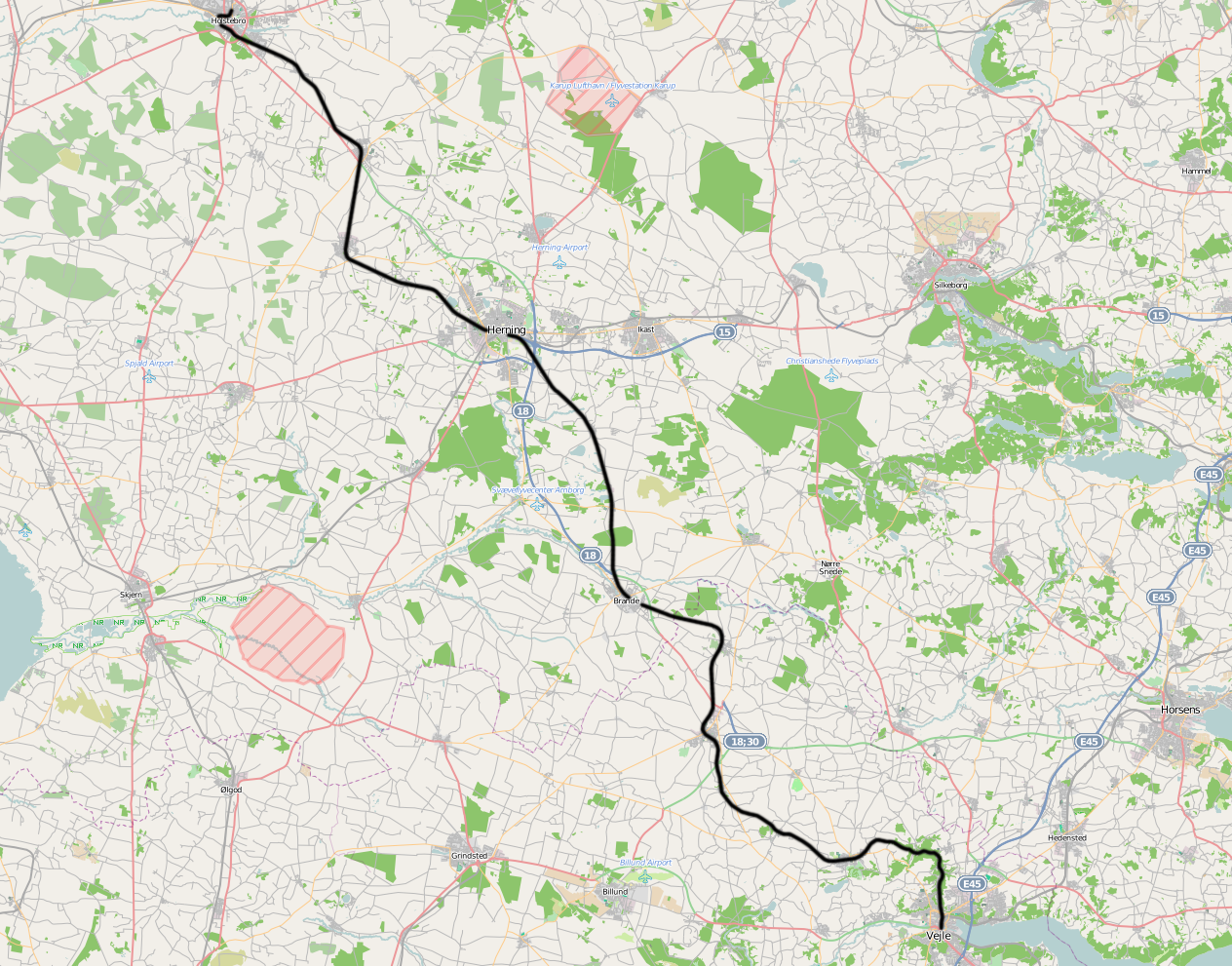

The Vejle–Holstebro railway line (Danish: Vejle-Holstebro banen) is a 114.0 km (70.8 mi) long standard-gauge single-track railway line in Denmark which runs through the central Jutland region between Vejle and Holstebro.

The section from Vejle to Give opened in 1894, the section from Give to Herning in 1914 and the section from Herning to Struer in 1904.

The line is owned and maintained by Banedanmark and served with intercity trains by the Danish State Railways (DSB) and regional trains by Arriva.

== History ==
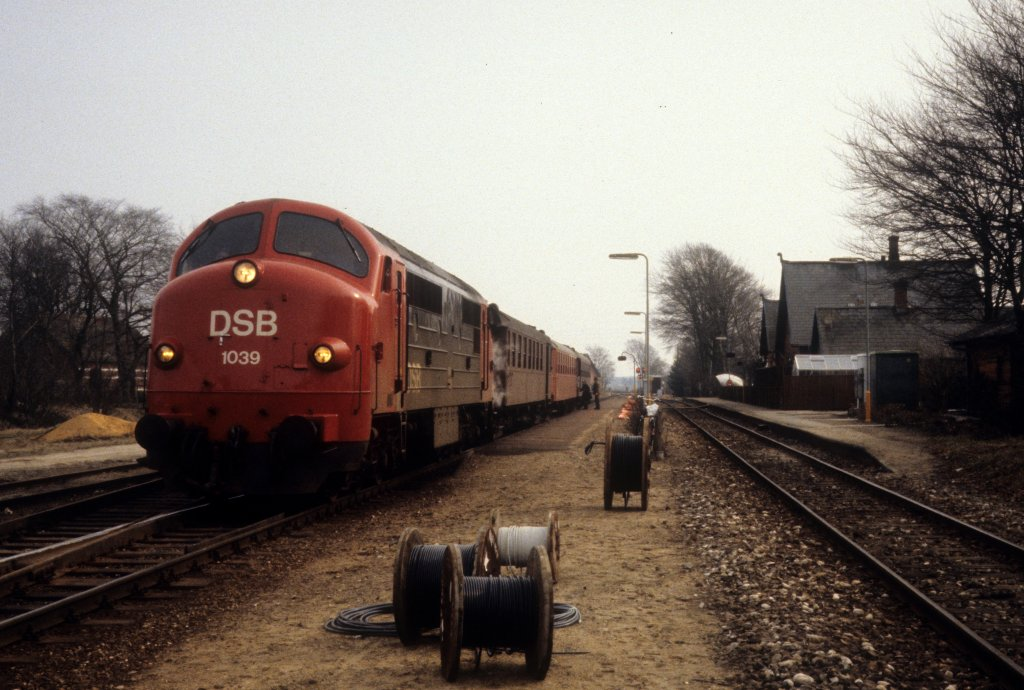
DSB train on the Vejle–Holstebro line calling at Tvis station in 1979

The section from Vejle to Give opened on 2 August 1894 as the private railway Vejle–Give (Danish: Vejle-Give Jernbane (VGJ)). In connection with the construction of the railway line between Give and Herning, the state took over ownership of VGJ on 1 April 1912. On 1 October 1914, the Danish State Railways (DSB) took over the operation of the line, which has since been operated as part of the Vejle–Holstebro railway line. The section from Give to Herning opened in 1914 and the section from Herning to Struer in 1904.

In 2018, operation of the regional rail services on the Vejle–Holstebro line were transferred from DSB to the public transport company Arriva.

== Operations ==
=== Regional trains ===
The railway company Arriva runs frequent regional train services from Vejle station to Struer station.

=== InterCity service ===
The Danish State Railways (DSB) operates four daily InterCity connections between Copenhagen and Struer.

== Stations ==
- Vejle (Vj)
- Vejle Sygehus (Vjs)
- Jelling (Jl)
- Give (Gw)
- Thyregod (Ty)
- Brande (Bb)
- Herning (Hr)
- Gødstrup
- Vildbjerg (Id)
- Aulum (Uu)
- Holstebro (Ho)

== See also ==
- List of railway lines in Denmark
