= Brande =

- town
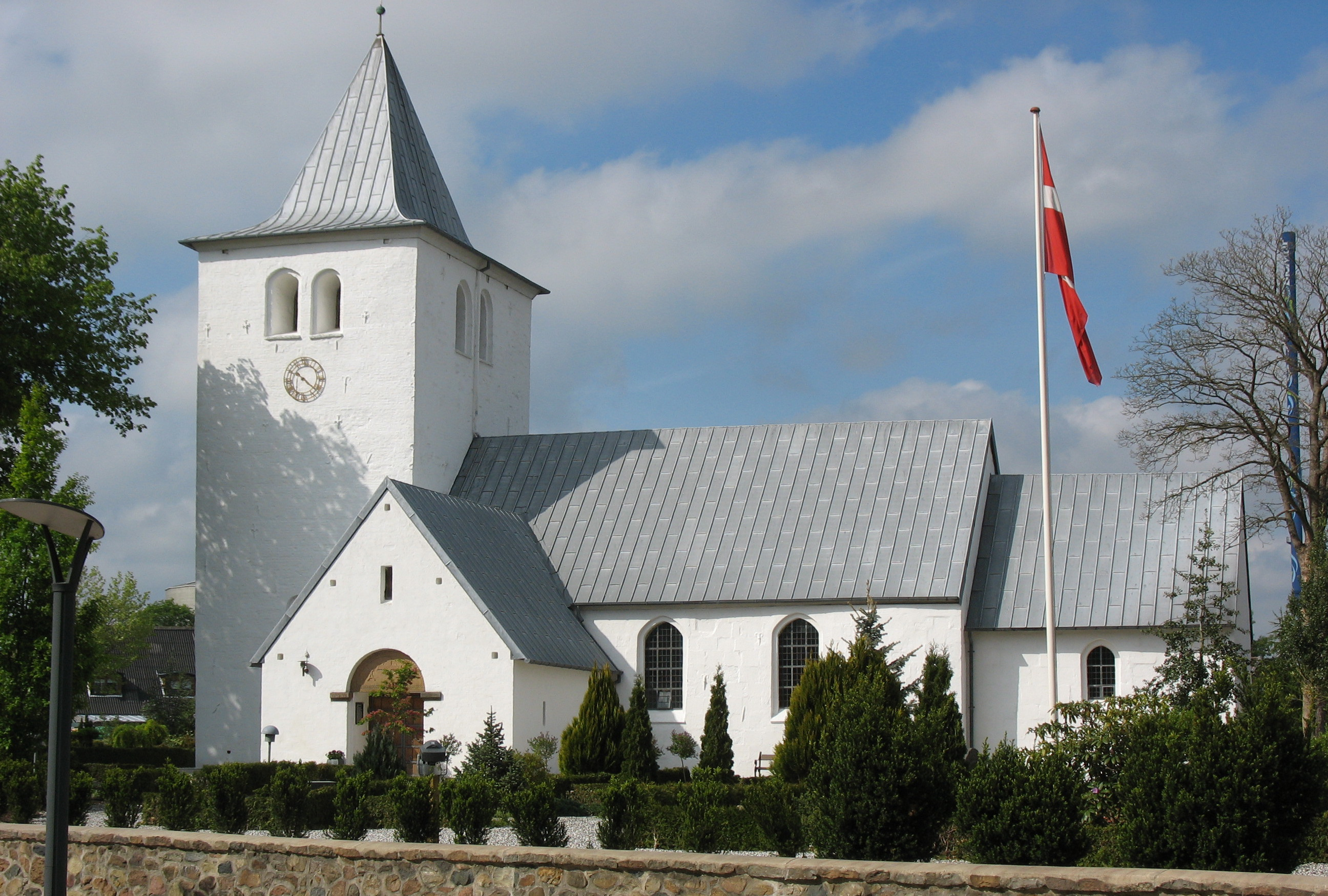
- Brande Church

- Location in Denmark Brande (Central Denmark Region)
- Coordinates: 55°57′N 9°07′E
- Country: Denmark
- Region: Central Denmark (Midtjylland)
- Municipality: Ikast-Brande Municipality

Area
  - Urban: 8.2 km^{2} (3.2 sq mi)

Population (2026)
  - Urban: 7,289
  - Urban density: 890/km^{2} (2,300/sq mi)
  - Gender: 3,647 males and 3,642 females
- Demonym: Brandit
- Time zone: UTC+1 (CET)
  - Summer (DST): UTC+2 (CEST)
- Postal code: DK-7330 Brande

Brande is a railway town with a population of 7,289 (1 January 2026) located at the railroad between Vejle and Herning in Ikast-Brande Municipality in Region Midtjylland in the central area of the Jutland peninsula in west Denmark.

Until 1 January 2007 it was the seat of the municipal-council of Brande Municipality.

Brande is the home of leading wind energy pioneer Bonus Energy A/S, now Siemens Gamesa Renewable Energy.

Brande is also home to Danish clothing companies Bestseller A/S and BTX Group.

== A Bestseller Tower was proposed ==
In the 2010s Bestseller wanted to create a new quarter Bestseller Village & Tower with housing, business park, hotel, education area, etc. in the north-eastern part of the town, and the centre of the quarter would have been a new high-rise building called Bestseller Tower (Danish: Bestseller-tårnet), a 320 metres tall skyscraper. It should have been the second-highest structure in Western Europe, surpassed only by the 324 metres of the Eiffel Tower, though 10.4 meters taller than the Shard in London. The project was approved in March 2019 by Ikast-Brande Municipality, but was shelved in 2020.

== The mural paintings of Brande ==
The mural paintings in Brande has made the city famous for its decorations and art in public spaces.

In 1966, doctor Ole Bendix and lawyer Jørgen Mansfeld-Giese initiated the creation of the first mural paintings. The art association "Midtjysk Kunstforening" was established in the old Askjær School and marked a new phase in the history of Brande cultural scene. The purpose of the organisation was to arrange special events within art, music, theater and film. Initially, the number of members reached 600, both from Brande and the surroundings. The mural paintings were one of the first projects and the goal was to create a gallery atmosphere in the open space without fixed opening hours. Art should be accessible for everybody in their daily life and form the basis of debate and inspiration.

Statens Kunstfond (Danish National Art Fund) supported the project, and artists started moving to Brande. The citizens were skeptic at first, but the mural paintings had put Brande on both the national and international map, and further to this, Brande was elected as the Danish city of the year in 1969. New mural paintings have been created during the years, some have been carefully restored and others have unfortunately disappeared due to new constructions and wear and tear.

== Joy of life, acrobat fantasy and spines ==
These are just some of the names of the mural paintings. Joy of life is made by the Finish artist Jorma Kardén decorating the library in Brande. Acrobat fantasy is created by K. Bjørn Knudsen and is visible at the old town hall in Storegade, Brande. Spines is painted by Claes Birch and can be seen in Borgergade.

== Art still characterizes Brande ==
Following the 1966 mural initiative, public art continued to develop in Brande. Notable community projects included the "Brande Carpet", a 275-metre-long work created from 3,000 pieces of painted fabric. In 1981, the sculpture ''Æ soikers kårner'' was installed to mark the centenary of the local craft and trade association, Brande Håndværker- og Borgerforening.

The cultural centre Kultursmedjen opened in 1991, and in 1992 cultural organiser Birgit Vinge Nielsen staged the multimedia production ''Drømmerejsen'' ("The Dream Journey") in the town's disused railway engine shed. The engine shed subsequently hosted cultural events and an annual international artists' workshop before the workshop relocated to Gludsted.

The old engine shed is now professionally restored and form the basis for conferences, concerts, talks and exhibitions.

“Art in movement" is one of the latest projects taking its starting point in Brande and the association "Kulturremisen". International artists stay for a certain period in a small village in the region to develop a permanent work of art in cooperation with the citizens. This project will cover both 2012 and 2013.

The tourist organization offers guided tours for both smaller and large groups among the mural paintings in Brande.

== Street Art Brande ==
The International Street Art Festival in Brande during the summer of 2015 and 2016 was a huge success, and it is planned to continue as an annual event.

In 2016, 19 professional street artists decorated the city square, streets and a new wall. All the activities attracted many guests in the festival weekend – and still many guests and tourists visit the area to see the colourful street art paintings.

== Gallery ==
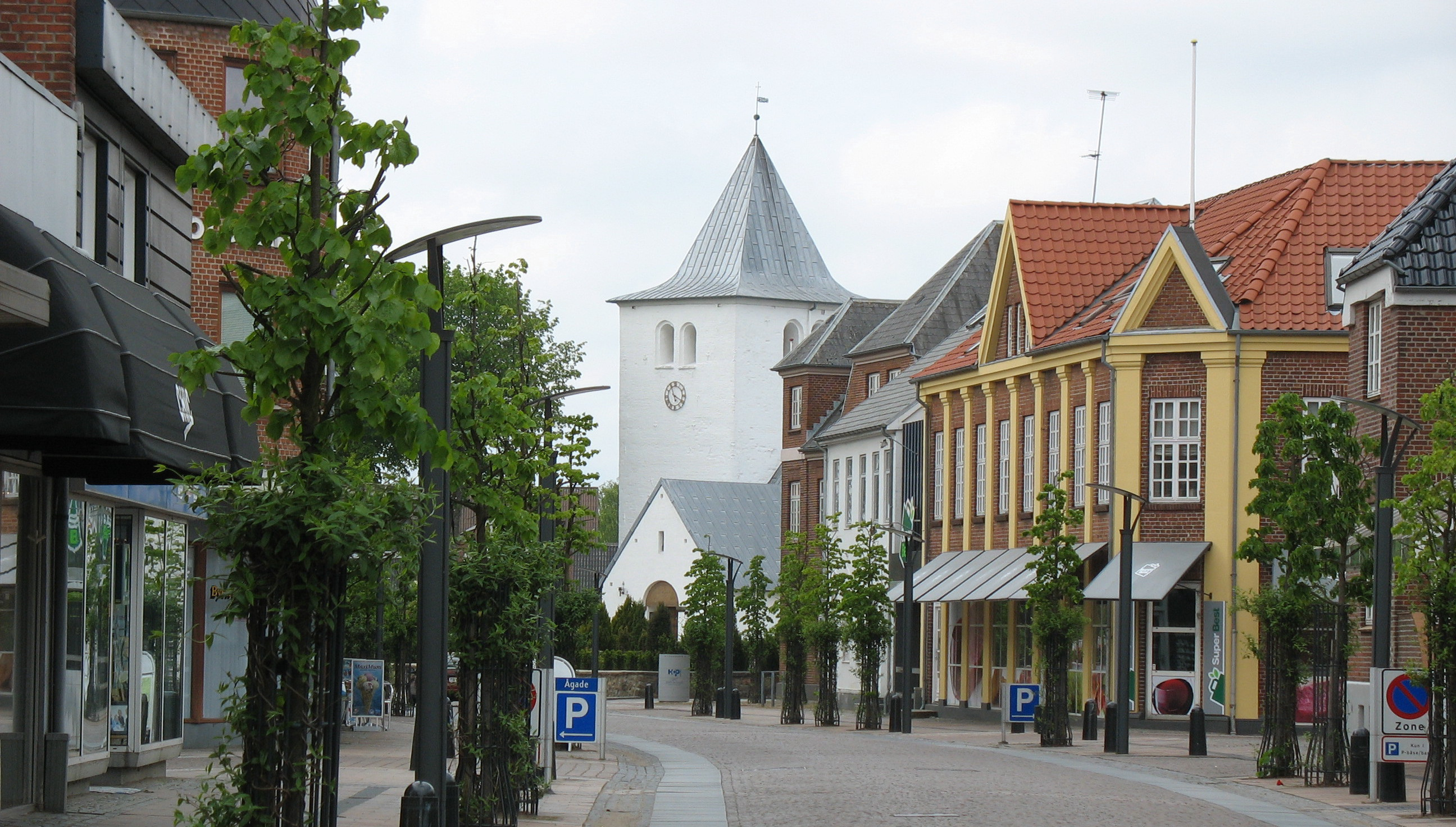
Brande - Storegade

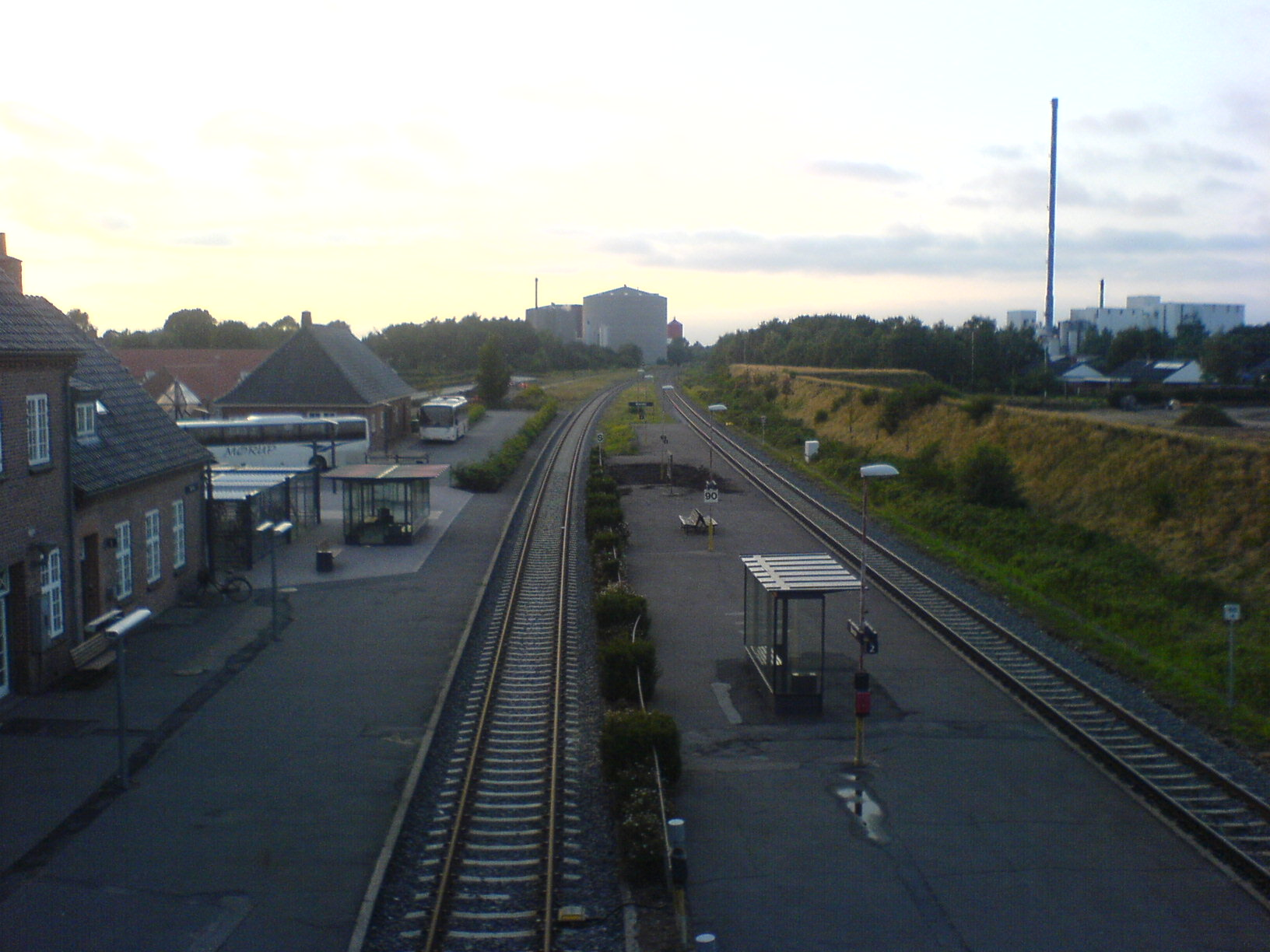
Brande railway station

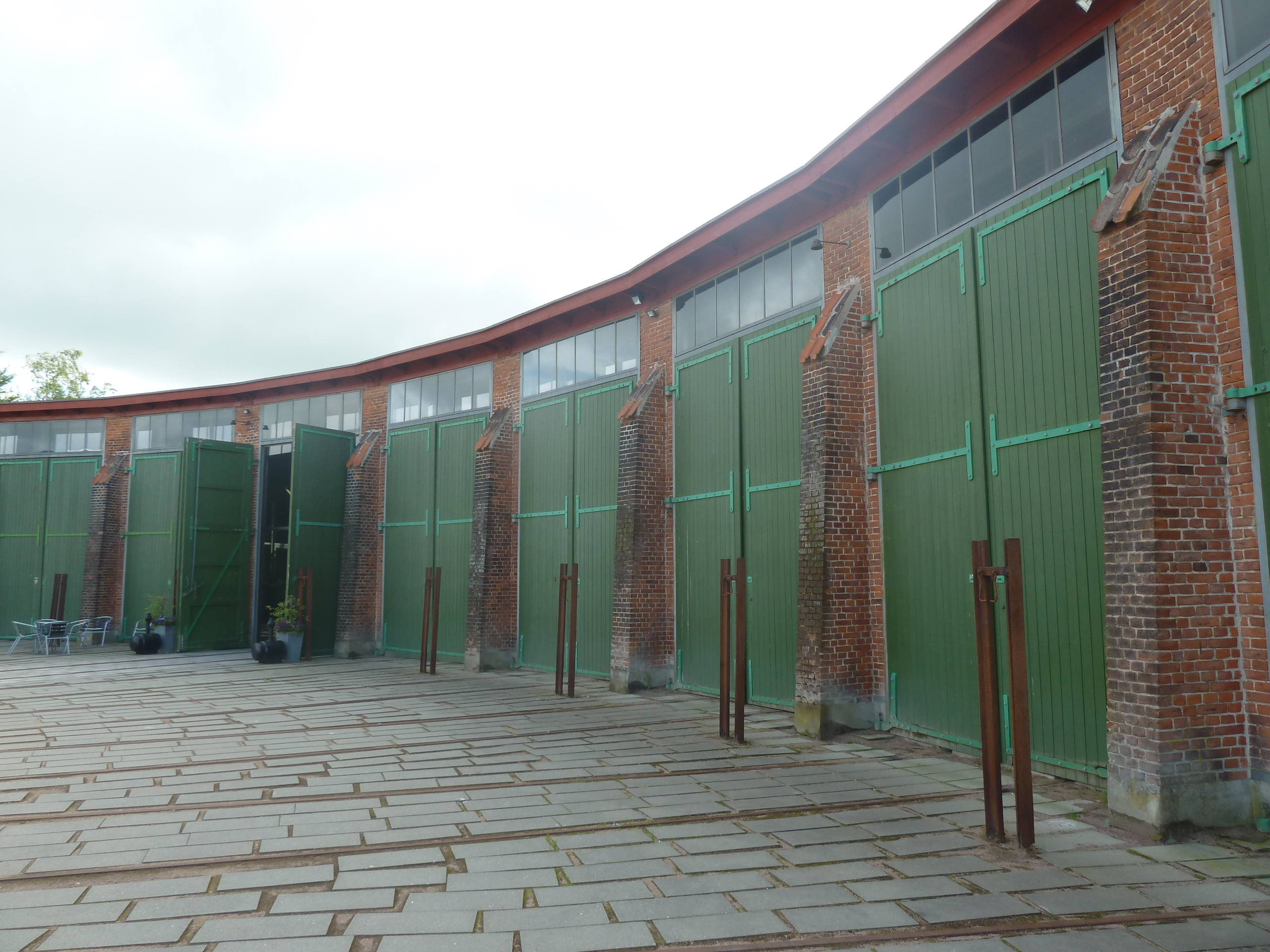
The former roundhouse at Brande Station

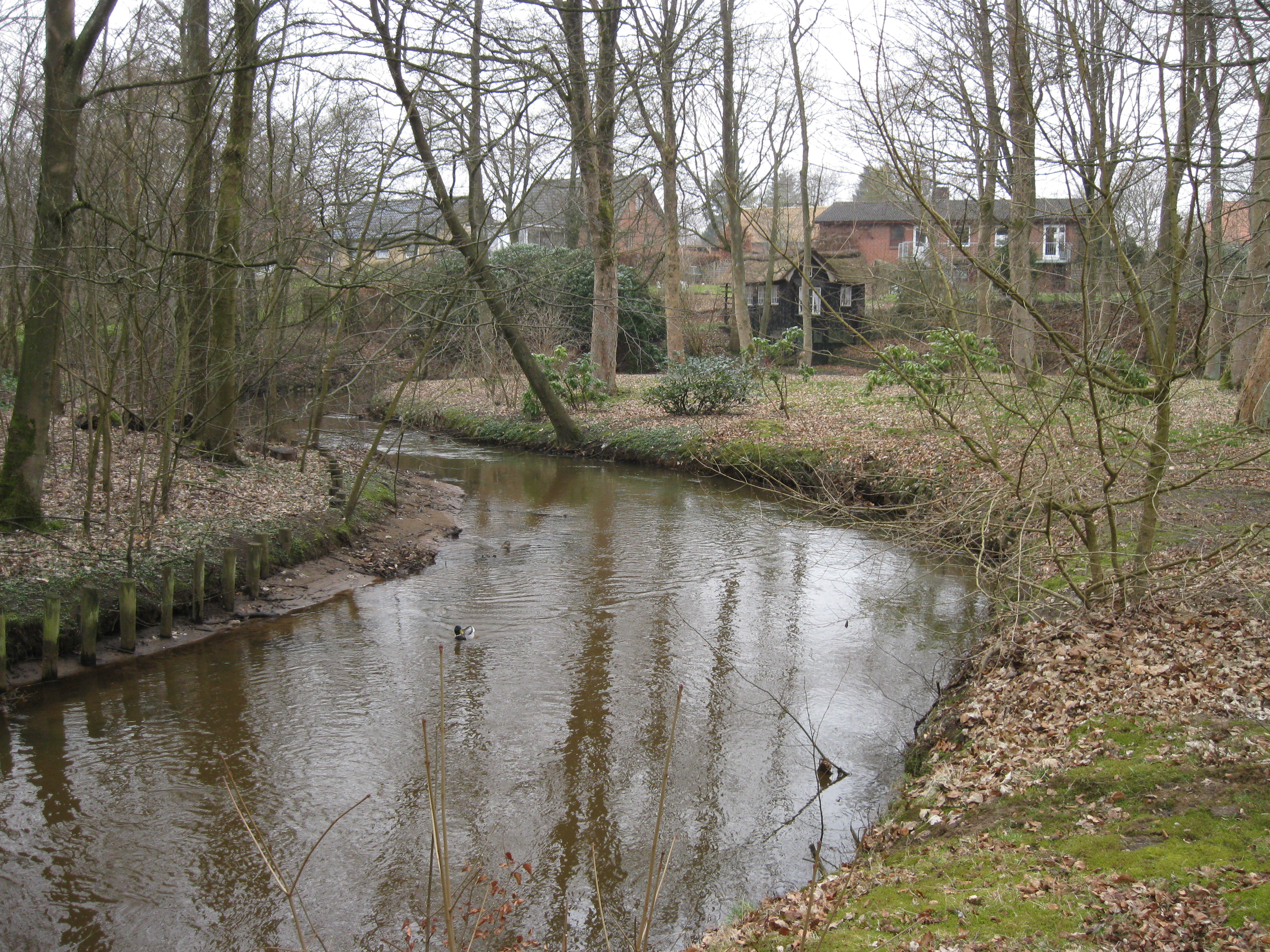
Brande Å

== Notable people ==
- Leon Jessen (born 1986 in Brande) a retired Danish football defender, over 200 club caps
- Rasmus Lauritsen (born 1996 in Brande) a Danish footballer, who plays as a centre back for Vejle Boldklub
- Rasmus Nissen Kristensen (born 1997 in Brande) a Danish footballer, plays for Leeds United F.C.

== Sister cities ==
The following cities are twinned with Brande:

- Äänekoski, Central Finland
