= Give, Denmark =

Give
- Town
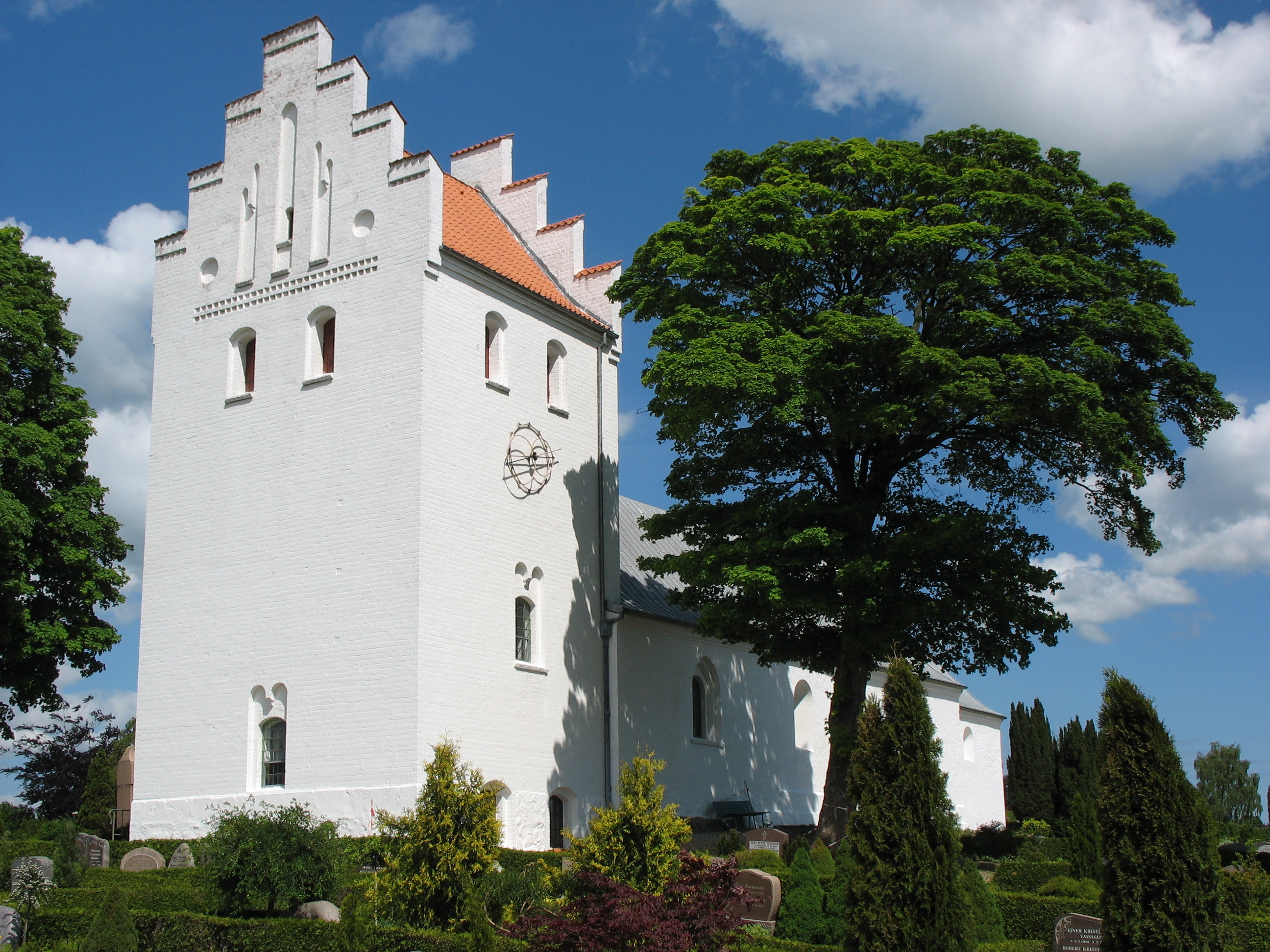
- Give Church

- Location in Denmark Give (Region of Southern Denmark)
- Coordinates: 55°50′42″N 9°14′20″E
- Country: Denmark
- Region: Southern Denmark
- Municipality: Vejle Municipality

Area
  - Urban: 4.5 km^{2} (1.7 sq mi)

Population (2026)
  - Urban: 5,215
  - Urban density: 1,200/km^{2} (3,000/sq mi)
  - Gender: 2,599 males and 2,616 females
- Time zone: UTC+1 (CET)
  - Summer (DST): UTC+2 (CEST)
- Postal code: DK-7323 Give

Give is a small railway town, with a population of 5,215 (1 January 2026), in Denmark 30 km northwest of Vejle. As a result of "The Municipal Reform" of 2007 Give Municipality was forced to join Vejle Municipality by the Løkke government.

The town is served by Give railway station which used to be the last stop going northwest from Vejle. Later the railway line would be continued to Herning and Holstebro.

Give Church was erected in the 12th century close by a sacred spring. The village of Give has since expanded and grew to prominence in 1892 when the Vejle–Give railway was opened.

== Business ==
Give is, with 55 specialty and retail stores, the shopping center for Vejle Municipality's western area.

DAN CAKE, a manufacturer of cakes, tarts and swiss rolls, is located in the town.

== Culture ==
Give is known as a town of sculptures – with more than 65 sculptures located around town – as an open-air gallery.

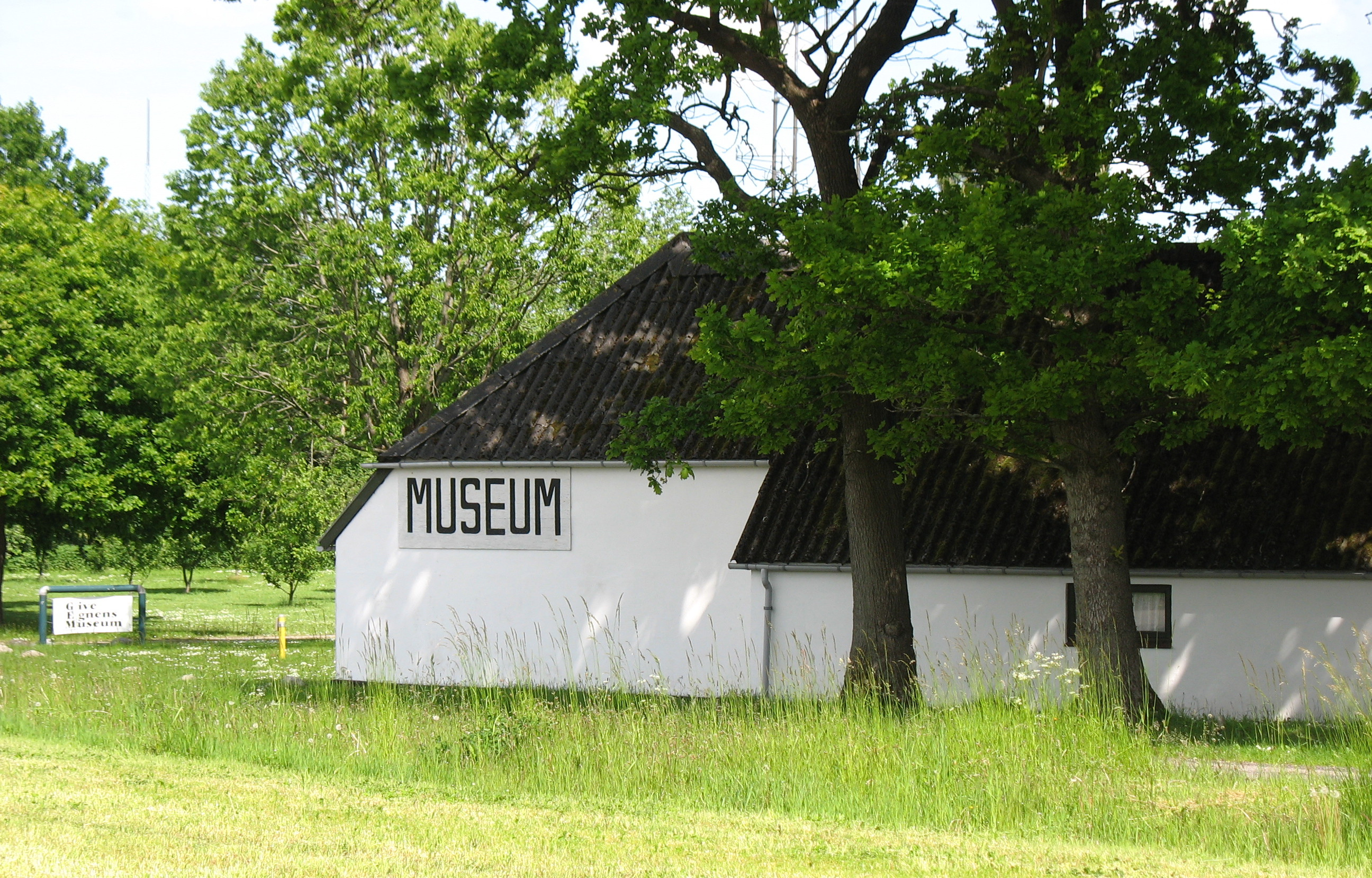
The historical museum

Give-Egnens-Museum is the town's historical museum. The museum's exhibitions tell about the surrounding farmland and about life in Denmark in general.

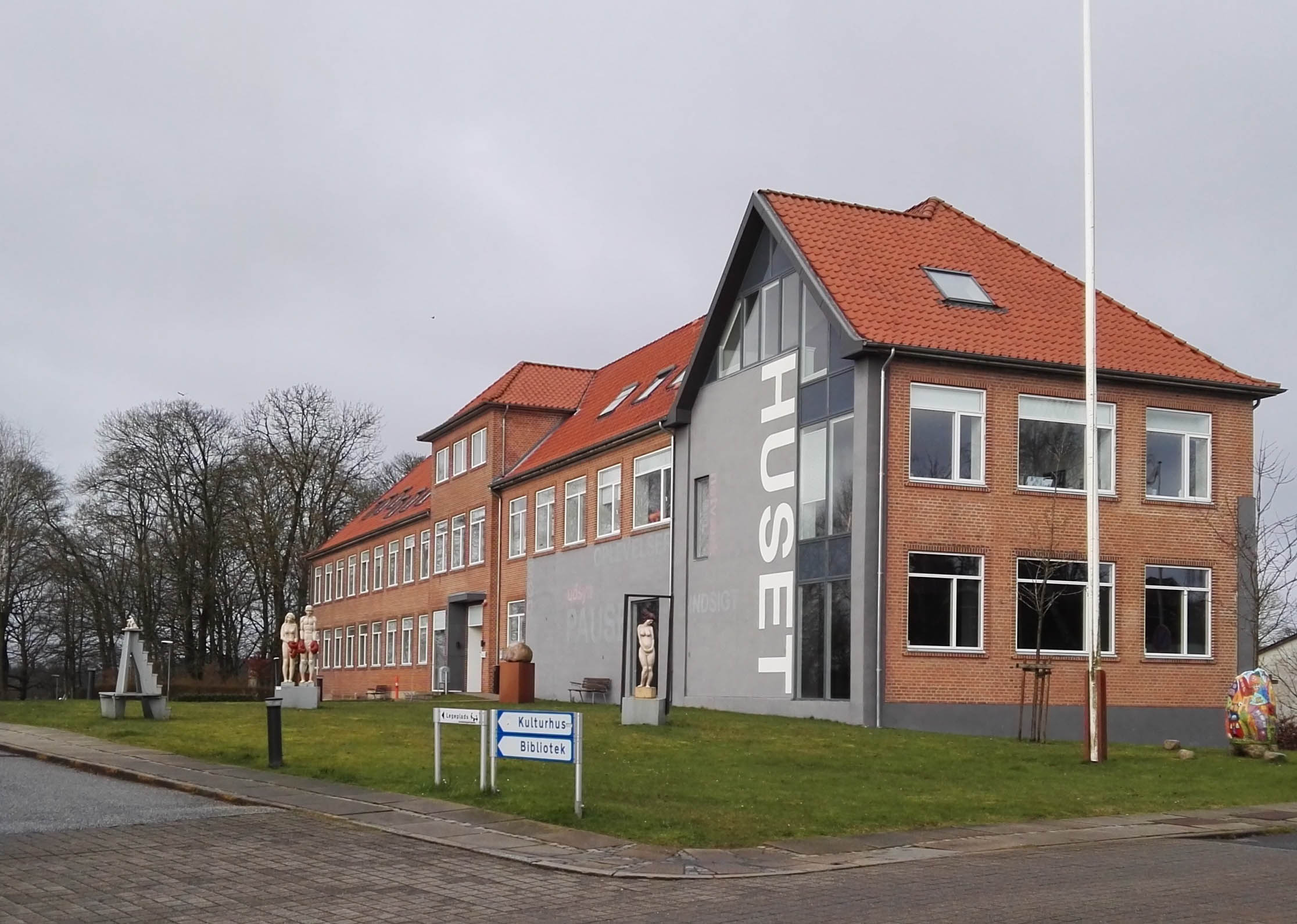
Give Public Library

Give Public Library named Huset is located in the former town hall of Give Municipality. The library host cultural events year-round, including visits by famous authors, public lectures and children's theatre performances.

== Notable people ==
- Bjarne Tromborg (born 1940 in Give) a Danish physicist, best known for his work in particle physics and photonics
- Torben Chris (born 1977 in Give) a Danish standup comedian
- Marc Pedersen (born 1989 in Give) a Danish professional football player, with over 150 club caps.
