= Vejle railway station =

Railway station in East Jutland, Denmark

Vejle
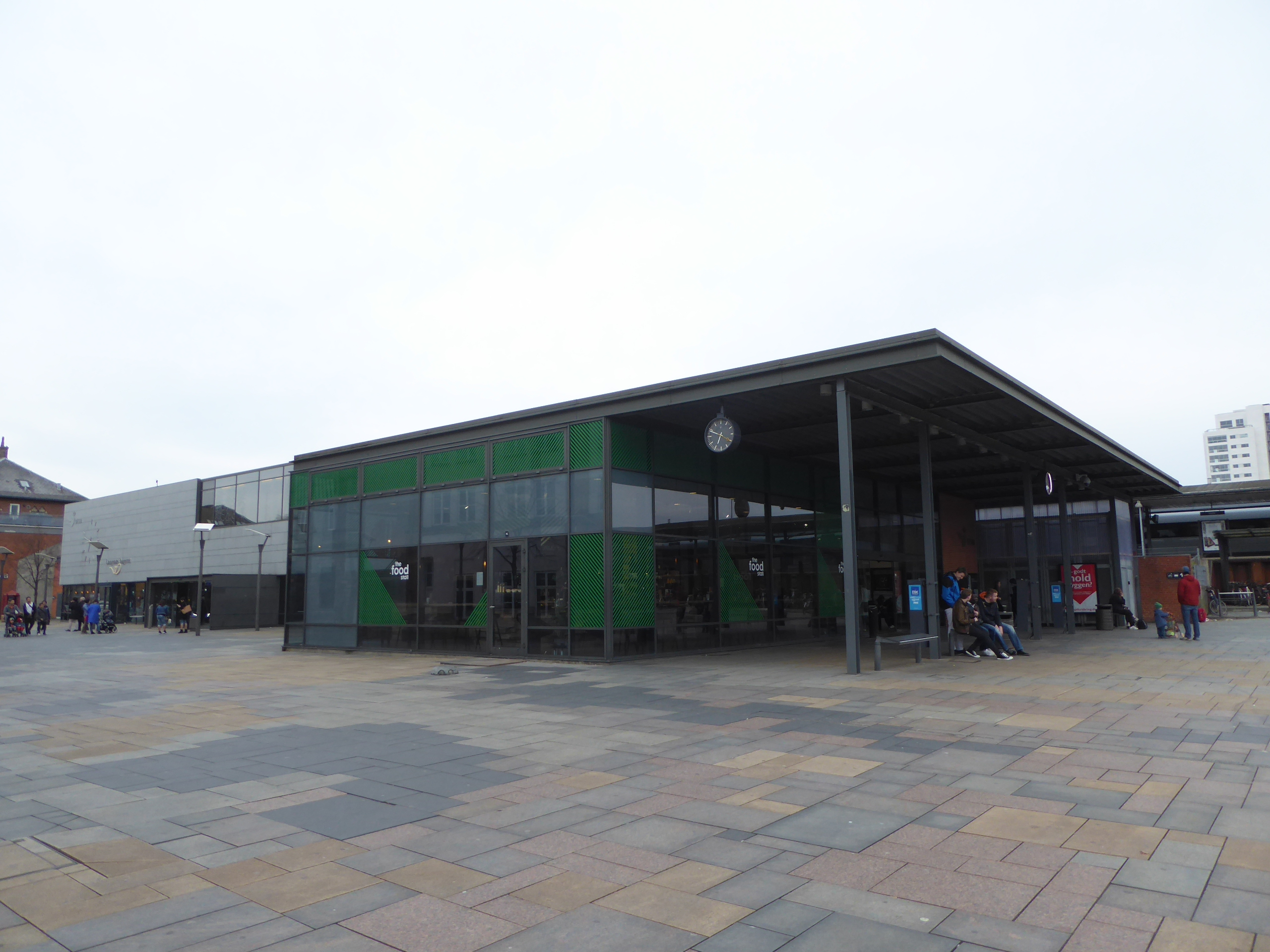
- Vejle station in 2017

General information
- Location: Banegårdspladsen 3B; 7100 Vejle; Vejle Municipality; Denmark
- Coordinates: 55°42′23″N 09°32′13″E
- Elevation: 2.1 metres (6 ft 11 in)
- Owner: DSB (station infrastructure); Banedanmark (rail infrastructure)
- Lines: Fredericia–Aarhus railway line Vejle–Holstebro railway line
- Platforms: 2
- Tracks: 3
- Train operators: DSB; GoCollective

History
- Opened: 4 October 1868

Services
Preceding station	DSB	Following station
Fredericia towards Copenhagen Airport	Copenhagen-Aalborg InterCityLyn	Horsens towards Aalborg Airport
Fredericia towards Copenhagen Airport	Copenhagen-Herning-Struer InterCityLyn	Vejle Sygehus towards Struer
Fredericia towards Copenhagen Central	Copenhagen-Aalborg InterCity	Horsens towards Aalborg Airport
Fredericia towards Esbjerg	Esbjerg–Aalborg InterCity	Horsens towards Aalborg
Brejning towards Fredericia	Fredericia-Aarhus Regional train	Hedensted towards Aarhus Central
Preceding station	DSB Vores Tog	Following station
Terminus	Vejle–Struer Regional train	Vejle Sygehus towards Struer
Location

Vejle railway station is a railway station serving the town of Vejle in East Jutland, Denmark. It is located in central Vejle, situated between the historic town centre and the Port of Vejle, and is integrated in the multimodal Vejle Transit Centre (Danish: Vejle Trafikcenter).

The station is located on the Fredericia–Aarhus railway line from Fredericia to Aarhus and is the southeastern terminus of the Vejle–Holstebro railway line from Vejle to Holstebro. It offers direct InterCity services to Copenhagen, Hamburg, Struer, Aarhus and Aalborg as well as regional train services to Aarhus, Fredericia, Herning, and Struer. The train services are operated by DSB and GoCollective.

== See also ==
- List of railway stations in Denmark
- Rail transport in Denmark
- History of rail transport in Denmark
- Transport in Denmark
