= 2025 Herning municipal election =

Municipal election in Denmark

← 2021	18 November 2025	2029 →

All 31 seats to the Herning municipal council 16 seats needed for a majority
- Turnout: 49,304 (69.5%) ▲0.7%
	First party	Second party	Third party
	V	A	F
Party	Venstre	Social Democrats	Green Left
Last election	17 seats, 50.5%	4 seats, 14.6%	2 seats, 4.7%
Seats won	15	3	3
Seat change	▼2	▼1	▲1
Popular vote	22,272	5,124	4,206
Percentage	45.9%	10.6%	8.7%
Swing	▼4.6%	▼4.0%	▲4.0%
	Fourth party	Fifth party	Sixth party
	Æ	B	C
Party	Denmark Democrats	Social Liberals	Conservatives
Last election	Did not stand	2 seats, 6.0%	2 seats, 4.5%
Seats won	2	2	2
Seat change	▲2	0	0
Popular vote	3,516	3,224	2,434
Percentage	7.2%	6.6%	5.0%
Swing	New	▲0.7%	▲0.5%
	Seventh party	Eighth party	Ninth party
	O	I	L
Party	Danish People's Party	Liberal Alliance	Borgerlisten
Last election	1 seat, 3.0%	0 seats, 1.3%	2 seats, 6.6%
Seats won	1	1	1
Seat change	0	▲1	▼1
Popular vote	1,985	1,926	1,694
Percentage	4.1%	4.0%	3.5%
Swing	▲1.1%	▲2.7%	▼3.1%
Mayor before election
Dorte West
Venstre
Mayor after election
Dorte West
Venstre

The 2025 Herning Municipal election was held on November 18, 2025, to elect the 31 members to sit in the regional council for the Herning Municipal council, in the period of 2026 to 2029. Venstre would lose 2 seats, and their absolute majority. However, Dorte West from the party, would still secure re-election.

== Background ==
Following the 2021 election, Dorte West from Venstre became mayor for her first term. She sought re-election in 2025.

== Electoral system ==
For elections to Danish municipalities, a number varying from 9 to 31 are chosen to be elected to the municipal council. The seats are then allocated using the D'Hondt method and a closed list proportional representation. Herning Municipality had 31 seats in 2025.

== Electoral alliances ==
=== Electoral Alliance 1 ===
Party		Political alignment
A	Social Democrats	Centre-left
L	Borgerlisten	Local politics

=== Electoral Alliance 2 ===
Party		Political alignment
B	Social Liberals	Centre to Centre-left
M	Moderates	Centre to Centre-right
V	Venstre	Centre-right

=== Electoral Alliance 3 ===
Party		Political alignment
C	Conservatives	Centre-right
D	New Right	Far-right
I	Liberal Alliance	Centre-right to Right-wing
K	Christian Democrats	Centre to Centre-right
O	Danish People's Party	Right-wing to Far-right
Æ	Denmark Democrats	Right-wing to Far-right

=== Electoral Alliance 4 ===
Party		Political alignment
F	Green Left	Centre-left to Left-wing
Ø	Red-Green Alliance	Left-wing to Far-Left

== Results by polling station ==
Division	A	B	C	D	F	I	K	L	M	O	V	Æ	Ø
Division	%	%	%	%	%	%	%	%	%	%	%	%	%
Herning (Kongrescentret)	12.9	8.4	5.0	0.2	10.9	4.8	2.1	3.7	0.7	4.5	40.1	4.9	1.9
Arnborg	10.4	3.7	0.9	0.3	4.9	2.9	0.9	1.1	0.4	2.7	61.2	9.6	1.0
Kibæk	19.0	2.4	3.2	0.0	5.6	2.5	3.7	1.5	0.2	4.8	45.7	10.8	0.5
Kølkær	22.1	2.8	2.3	0.6	10.4	4.7	2.1	1.7	0.2	4.5	33.8	13.8	1.1
Lind	9.6	8.4	3.3	0.2	8.9	4.2	1.5	3.1	0.3	3.2	51.8	4.9	0.6
Sdr. Felding	6.7	1.5	1.5	0.3	7.6	1.2	3.8	2.9	0.0	4.0	59.4	10.6	0.5
Skarrild	3.7	3.7	1.3	0.4	3.5	1.7	2.4	1.7	0.0	3.5	68.4	8.6	1.1
Studsgård	21.1	6.7	1.9	0.5	6.9	4.5	2.4	1.4	0.7	3.3	35.2	14.4	1.0
Aulum	14.7	2.3	4.8	0.3	5.0	5.6	4.1	1.1	0.2	3.6	49.5	8.3	0.5
Feldborg	6.9	0.9	0.7	0.2	3.1	2.1	0.2	1.4	0.0	1.7	74.2	7.8	0.7
Gullestrup	14.4	5.5	4.1	0.3	13.9	3.6	3.3	3.2	0.4	5.4	36.4	6.1	3.4
Haderup	6.2	1.7	1.7	0.6	4.4	2.4	1.5	1.2	0.3	4.0	64.1	11.2	0.6
Hammerum	8.8	17.0	8.3	0.3	8.6	3.7	2.9	4.5	0.6	4.3	35.5	4.8	0.9
Hodsager	4.4	3.1	2.1	0.5	5.4	4.1	0.5	1.0	0.0	3.8	62.1	12.8	0.3
Ilskov	7.9	2.1	2.5	0.2	7.5	2.7	1.5	1.7	1.0	3.5	53.6	14.8	1.0
Simmelkær	5.1	4.6	3.0	2.5	1.5	5.1	1.0	4.6	0.5	7.6	43.1	20.3	1.0
Sinding	5.9	2.2	0.8	0.0	6.3	2.2	1.8	2.4	1.2	6.7	61.4	8.7	0.6
Skibbild/Nøvling	10.5	2.6	8.4	0.5	9.8	3.5	4.0	3.9	0.4	5.8	38.9	10.4	1.2
Snejbjerg	8.5	4.0	3.7	0.2	8.9	3.8	1.9	2.0	0.4	3.5	53.8	8.7	0.6
Sunds	7.2	5.5	4.5	0.5	9.8	4.5	0.9	7.3	0.8	5.0	44.6	8.6	0.8
Timring	5.9	2.2	7.3	0.4	4.7	2.6	6.0	4.5	0.4	5.2	47.9	12.4	0.4
Tjørring	9.6	6.2	8.7	0.2	11.1	3.4	3.8	3.5	0.6	3.4	43.3	5.3	0.7
Vildbjerg	7.3	3.1	9.5	0.2	5.3	2.6	4.6	6.7	0.5	3.9	46.6	9.0	0.8
Vind	10.3	0.7	1.4	0.0	6.4	5.0	2.5	2.8	0.0	3.9	55.3	9.6	2.1
Vinding	6.0	2.0	1.4	0.4	5.0	3.8	3.2	2.6	0.3	2.9	63.6	8.0	0.7
Ørnhøj	8.0	1.5	1.7	0.7	4.1	7.3	1.9	2.5	0.5	3.9	47.4	19.8	0.8

== Results ==
Party		Votes	%	+/-	Seats	+/-
Herning Municipality
V	Venstre	22,272	45.90	-4.63	15	-2
A	Social Democrats	5,124	10.56	-4.02	3	-1
F	Green Left	4,206	8.67	+3.99	3	+1
Æ	Denmark Democrats	3,516	7.25	New	2	New
B	Social Liberals	3,224	6.64	+0.68	2	0
C	Conservatives	2,434	5.02	+0.48	2	0
O	Danish People's Party	1,985	4.09	+1.06	1	0
I	Liberal Alliance	1,926	3.97	+2.68	1	+1
L	Borgerlisten	1,694	3.49	-3.12	1	-1
K	Christian Democrats	1,241	2.56	-1.97	1	0
Ø	Red-Green Alliance	531	1.09	-0.60	0	0
M	Moderates	241	0.50	New	0	New
D	New Right	130	0.27	-2.05	0	0
Total		48,524	100	N/A	31	N/A
Invalid votes		150	0.21	+0.03		
Blank votes		630	0.89	+0.25		
Turnout		49,304	69.47	+0.65		
Source: valg.dk

== Opinion polls ==
Polling firm	Fieldwork date	Sample size	V	A	L	B	F	C	K	O	D	Ø	I	M	Æ	Others	Lead
Epinion	4 Sep - 13 Oct 2025	490	42.4	13.7	–	1.9	8.8	3.2	–	4.0	–	1.1	6.6	0.9	12.3	5.2	28.7
2024 european parliament election	9 Jun 2024		23.8	12.8	–	4.5	10.1	10.4	–	6.5	–	2.3	8.7	5.8	13.6	–	10.2
2022 general election	1 Nov 2022		21.6	22.5	–	1.8	5.3	6.6	2.4	2.0	3.0	1.9	9.5	7.8	14.0	–	0.9
2021 regional election	16 Nov 2021		39.8	24.3	–	3.1	4.5	9.2	5.9	3.6	3.6	2.4	1.7	–	–	–	15.5
2021 municipal election	16 Nov 2021		50.5 (17)	14.6 (4)	6.6 (2)	6.0 (2)	4.7 (2)	4.5 (2)	4.5 (1)	3.0 (1)	2.3 (0)	1.7 (0)	1.3 (0)	–	–	–	35.9
