= 2021 Herning municipal election =

← 2017	16 November 2021	2025 →

All 31 seats to the Herning Municipal Council 16 seats needed for a majority
- Turnout: 48,214 (68.8%) ▼5.4pp
	First party	Second party	Third party
	V	A	H
Party	Venstre	Social Democrats	Borgerlisten
Last election	19 seats, 55.6%	5 seats, 16.8%	Did not stand
Seats won	17	4	2
Seat change	▼2	▼1	▲2
Popular vote	24.062	6,942	3,148
Percentage	50.5%	14.6%	6.6%
Swing	▼5.1%	▼2.2%	New
	Fourth party	Fifth party	Sixth party
	B	F	C
Party	Social Liberals	Green Left	Conservatives
Last election	1 seats, 5.0%	1 seats, 4.3%	2 seats, 4.2%
Seats won	2	2	2
Seat change	▲1	▲1	0
Popular vote	2,838	2,228	2,162
Percentage	6.0%	4.7%	4.5%
Swing	▲1.0%	▲0.4%	▲0.3%
	Seventh party	Eighth party	Ninth party
	K	O	Ø
Party	Christian Democrats	Danish People's Party	Red–Green Alliance
Last election	1 seat, 3.2%	1 seat, 5.7%	1 seat, 2.2%
Seats won	1	1	0
Seat change	0	0	▼1
Popular vote	2,157	1,443	805
Percentage	4.5%	3.0%	1.7%
Swing	▲1.3%	▼2.7%	▼0.5%
Mayor before election
Lars Krarup
Venstre
Mayor after election
Dorte West
Venstre

Since the 2007 municipal reform, Venstre had always had an absolute majority of seats in Herning Municipality. On November 30, 2020, Lars Krarup, mayor at the time, announced his resignation, and cited that he did it to make room for Dorte West. Despite losing 2 seats, Venstre would once again win an absolute majority of seats, and it was later announced that Dorte West would continue as mayor, which she had been since Lars Krarup stepped down.

== Electoral system ==
For elections to Danish municipalities, a number varying from 9 to 31 are chosen to be elected to the municipal council. The seats are then allocated using the D'Hondt method and a closed list proportional representation. Herning Municipality had 31 seats in 2021

Unlike in Danish General Elections, in elections to municipal councils, electoral alliances are allowed.

== Electoral alliances ==
=== Electoral Alliance 1 ===
Party		Political alignment
F	Green Left	Centre-left to Left-wing
Ø	Red–Green Alliance	Left-wing to Far-Left

=== Electoral Alliance 2 ===
Party		Political alignment
B	Social Liberals	Centre to Centre-left
V	Venstre	Centre-right

=== Electoral Alliance 3 ===
Party		Political alignment
C	Conservatives	Centre-right
I	Liberal Alliance	Centre-right to Right-wing
K	Christian Democrats	Centre to Centre-right
O	Danish People's Party	Right-wing to Far-right

== Results by polling station ==
Division	A	B	C	D	F	H	I	K	O	V	Æ	Ø
Division	%	%	%	%	%	%	%	%	%	%	%	%
Herning	17.0	7.9	5.2	1.8	5.9	7.2	1.8	3.3	3.0	44.0	0.3	2.7
Arnborg	14.7	2.1	3.6	5.4	2.6	9.1	0.3	1.8	6.5	52.7	0.5	0.8
Kibæk	19.3	2.7	3.7	2.1	2.1	4.4	0.8	5.0	2.6	56.3	0.2	0.8
Kølkær	14.8	4.4	2.5	5.0	3.6	6.0	0.4	4.6	6.0	50.3	0.4	2.1
Lind	12.1	5.5	3.7	1.8	4.5	6.8	1.1	2.5	1.8	58.7	0.3	1.1
Sdr. Felding	11.7	1.8	2.0	1.8	4.0	3.6	0.5	5.1	4.6	63.5	0.0	1.5
Skarrild	7.8	6.2	1.8	4.7	1.8	2.5	0.7	5.1	4.9	62.3	0.0	2.2
Studsgård	14.3	24.0	1.8	3.2	3.6	2.7	1.6	5.0	5.2	37.6	0.5	0.7
Aulum	16.7	3.0	4.3	2.7	1.8	3.2	2.3	10.8	2.9	51.0	0.3	1.1
Feldborg	9.7	2.6	1.0	4.0	2.6	2.4	0.7	1.7	4.0	69.4	0.5	1.4
Gullestrup	19.9	4.6	2.6	1.9	10.4	5.9	1.2	5.8	3.4	38.8	0.3	5.1
Haderup	7.8	2.8	5.9	7.2	3.1	4.1	0.8	2.5	3.0	61.9	0.0	0.9
Hammerum	12.8	10.7	6.1	1.9	3.9	7.5	1.1	4.4	2.5	47.1	0.2	1.8
Hodsager	8.7	3.1	1.5	3.6	3.3	3.1	1.8	5.6	4.1	63.1	0.0	2.1
Ilskov	16.5	5.6	5.2	2.9	3.3	5.8	1.7	2.9	8.1	45.7	0.2	1.9
Simmelkær	10.3	3.6	2.2	9.8	3.6	8.5	0.4	4.5	7.6	47.3	0.4	1.8
Sinding	11.0	8.7	1.7	1.1	2.8	5.7	0.9	3.6	5.7	57.1	0.0	1.7
Skibbild/Nøvling	13.3	3.3	0.7	3.5	3.3	5.6	0.7	6.1	4.2	57.6	0.4	1.2
Snejbjerg	13.8	5.3	4.4	2.1	4.8	5.8	1.0	4.9	2.5	54.3	0.3	0.8
Sunds	10.4	5.4	5.8	2.4	4.4	10.2	1.1	2.3	2.5	54.2	0.3	1.0
Vinding	12.6	1.6	1.1	2.3	3.3	4.3	1.8	8.8	2.8	59.9	0.2	1.2
Timring	16.3	1.7	3.1	2.3	3.6	4.6	1.0	10.3	5.1	50.6	0.3	1.1
Tjørring	12.9	4.7	5.7	2.0	9.1	9.4	0.9	5.9	2.2	45.7	0.2	1.3
Vildbjerg	16.8	2.9	5.0	2.1	2.3	7.0	0.6	6.3	2.3	54.0	0.0	0.6
Vind	17.9	3.2	6.7	4.6	3.5	3.5	3.9	2.8	3.2	48.4	0.0	2.5
Ørnhøj	14.3	3.2	4.0	2.7	1.6	4.6	2.7	3.5	5.3	56.5	0.8	0.8

== Results ==
Party		Votes	%	+/-	Seats	+/-
Herning Municipality
V	Venstre	24,062	50.52	-5.06	17	-2
A	Social Democrats	6,942	14.58	-2.23	4	-1
H	Borgerlisten	3,148	6.61	New	2	New
B	Social Liberals	2,838	5.96	+0.98	2	+1
F	Green Left	2,228	4.68	+0.37	2	+1
C	Conservatives	2,162	4.54	+0.29	2	0
K	Christian Democrats	2,157	4.53	+1.31	1	0
O	Danish People's Party	1,443	3.03	-2.64	1	0
D	New Right	1,102	2.31	+1.81	0	0
Ø	Red-Green Alliance	805	1.69	-0.53	0	-1
I	Liberal Alliance	613	1.29	-0.21	0	0
Æ	Freedom List	124	0.26	New	0	New
Total		47,624	100	N/A	31	N/A
Invalid votes		130	0.19	+0.02		
Blank votes		460	0.66	+0.06		
Turnout		48,214	68.82	-5.39		
Source: valg.dk
