= Lars Friis =

Danish football manager (born 1976)

Personal information
- Date of birth: 7 May 1976 (age 50)
- Place of birth: Feldborg, Denmark

Youth career
- Feldborg/Haderup IF
- Aulum IF
- Ikast FS

Senior career*
Years	Team	Apps	(Gls)
–1999	Feldborg/Haderup IF		

Managerial career
- 2018–2019: Brentford B
- 2021–2022: Viborg
- 2022: AaB
- 2024–2025: Sparta Prague
- 2026: Cercle Brugge
- * Club domestic league appearances and goals

Lars Friis (born 7 May 1976) is a Danish professional football manager.

== Playing career ==
Lars Friis was born on 7 May 1976 in Feldborg, Denmark. He started playing youth football for local club, Feldborg-Haderup IF. Known for his technical ability and dedication, he often played as a centre-back or midfielder, despite not being particularly fast or physically imposing.

After a year at a nearby efterskole, where he played for Aulum IF, Friis joined Ikast FS, competing at the top youth levels before the formation of Midtjylland.

He later returned to FHIF to start his senior career but was forced to retire at age 23 due to a cruciate ligament injury.

== Coaching career ==
Friis began his coaching career in 1999 at Midtjylland, where he was until 2015, when he also left the club shortly after Glen Riddersholm's departure. Soon after, he accompanied Riddersholm to AGF as an assistant. In the spring of 2018, he was offered to join Brentford as a development coach, but after a year he returned to AGF as an assistant, now for David Nielsen.

== Managerial career ==
In January 2021, he took up his first head coaching position when he joined Viborg, replacing Jacob Neestrup. At the time Viborg were leading the 2020-21 Danish 1st Division, and he would go on to win the division and thus secure promotion to the Danish Superliga.

In January 2022 he was signed by AaB, but was unable to get out of his contract until compensation was paid to Viborg by AaB. He officially became AaB manager on 9 March 2022. Following a poor start to the 2022–23 Danish Superliga season Friis was sacked by AaB on 15 September 2022. On 16 December 2022, Friis was hired as an assistant coach to Sparta Prague manager Brian Priske. On 12 June 2024, Friis was appointed as the manager of Sparta Prague, replacing Priske, who became the manager of Feyenoord. On 15 May 2025, one day after a 1–3 loss in the Czech Cup final against Sigma Olomouc, Friis was sacked as head coach with team on the 4th place in the league table and four losses in a row.

In March 2026, Friis became new manager of Belgian Pro League club Cercle Brugge.

== Managerial statistics ==
As of match played 1 November 2026

Managerial record by team and tenure
Team	Nat	From	To	Record							
Team	Nat	From	To	G	W	D	L	GF	GA	GD	Win %
Viborg	(Denmark)	16 January 2021	8 March 2022	34	17	10	7	65	37	+28	50.00
AaB	(Denmark)	9 March 2022	15 September 2022	22	6	4	12	27	36	−9	27.27
Sparta Prague	(Czech Republic)	1 July 2024	15 May 2025	51	28	7	16	89	70	+19	54.90
Cercle Brugge	(Belgium)	23 March 2026	2 November 2026	17	5	4	8	29	34	−5	29.41
Total				124	56	25	43	210	177	+33	45.16
