= Herning Messecenter railway halt =

Railway station in Herning, Denmark

Herning Messecenter
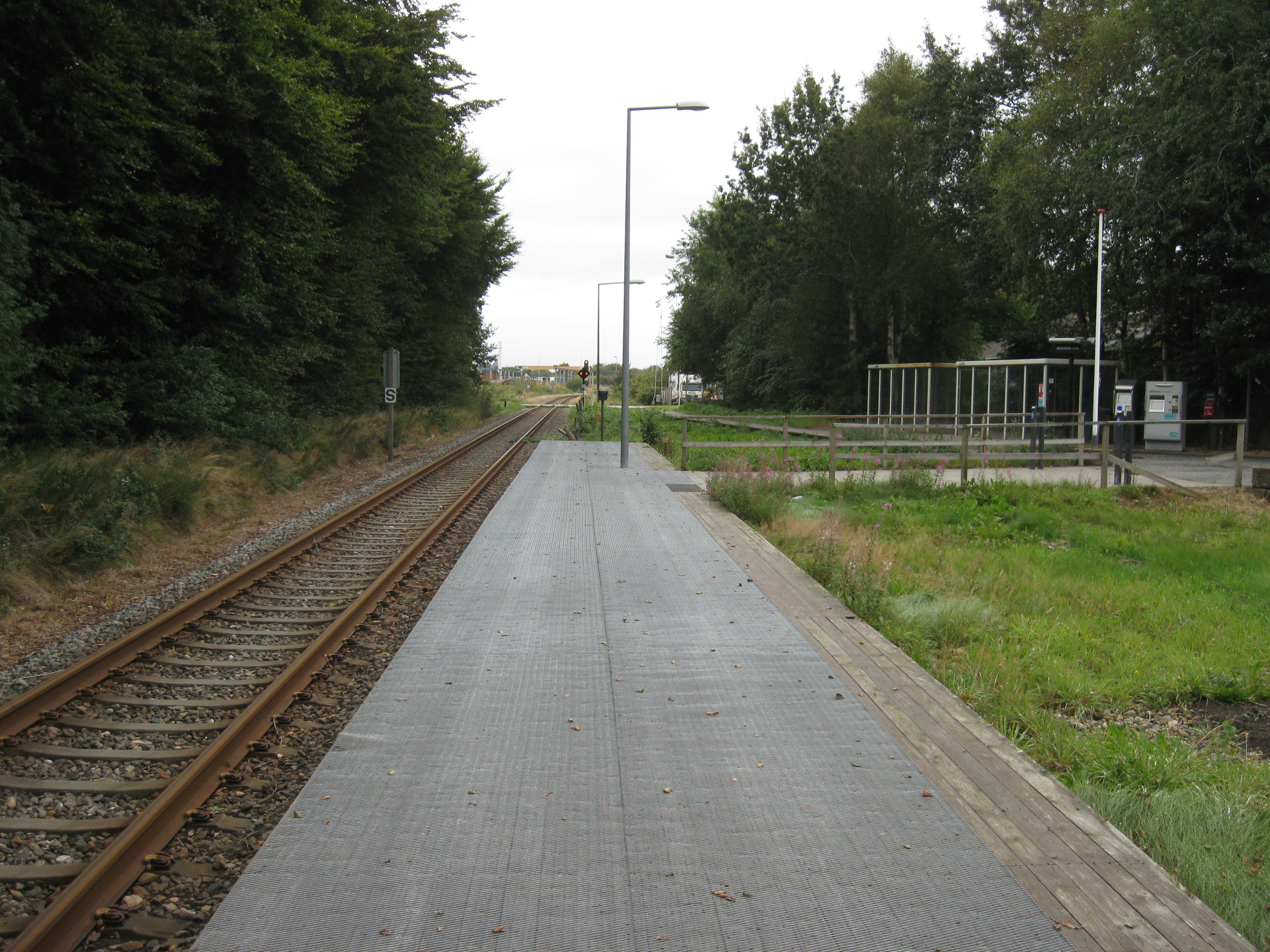
- Herning Messecenter railway halt in 2012

General information
- Location: Baggeskærvej 10; 7400 Herning; Herning Municipality; Denmark
- Coordinates: 56°07′25″N 8°56′41″E
- Elevation: 54.5 metres (179 ft)
- Owner: Banedanmark
- Line: Skanderborg–Skjern line
- Platforms: 1
- Tracks: 1
- Train operators: GoCollective

History
- Opened: 1997

Services
Preceding station	GoCollective	Following station
Studsgård towards Skjern	Aarhus–Skjern Regional train	Herning towards Aarhus Central
Location

Herning Messecenter station is a railway halt in the western part of the city of Herning in Jutland, Denmark. The station serves the exhibition centre and entertainment complex of Messecenter Herning in the western part of Herning.

Herning Messecenter railway halt is located on the Skanderborg–Skjern line, and opened in 1997. It offers direct regional train services to Herning, Aarhus, and Skjern operated by the public transport company GoCollective.

== See also ==
- List of railway stations in Denmark
