= Troldhede =

- Town
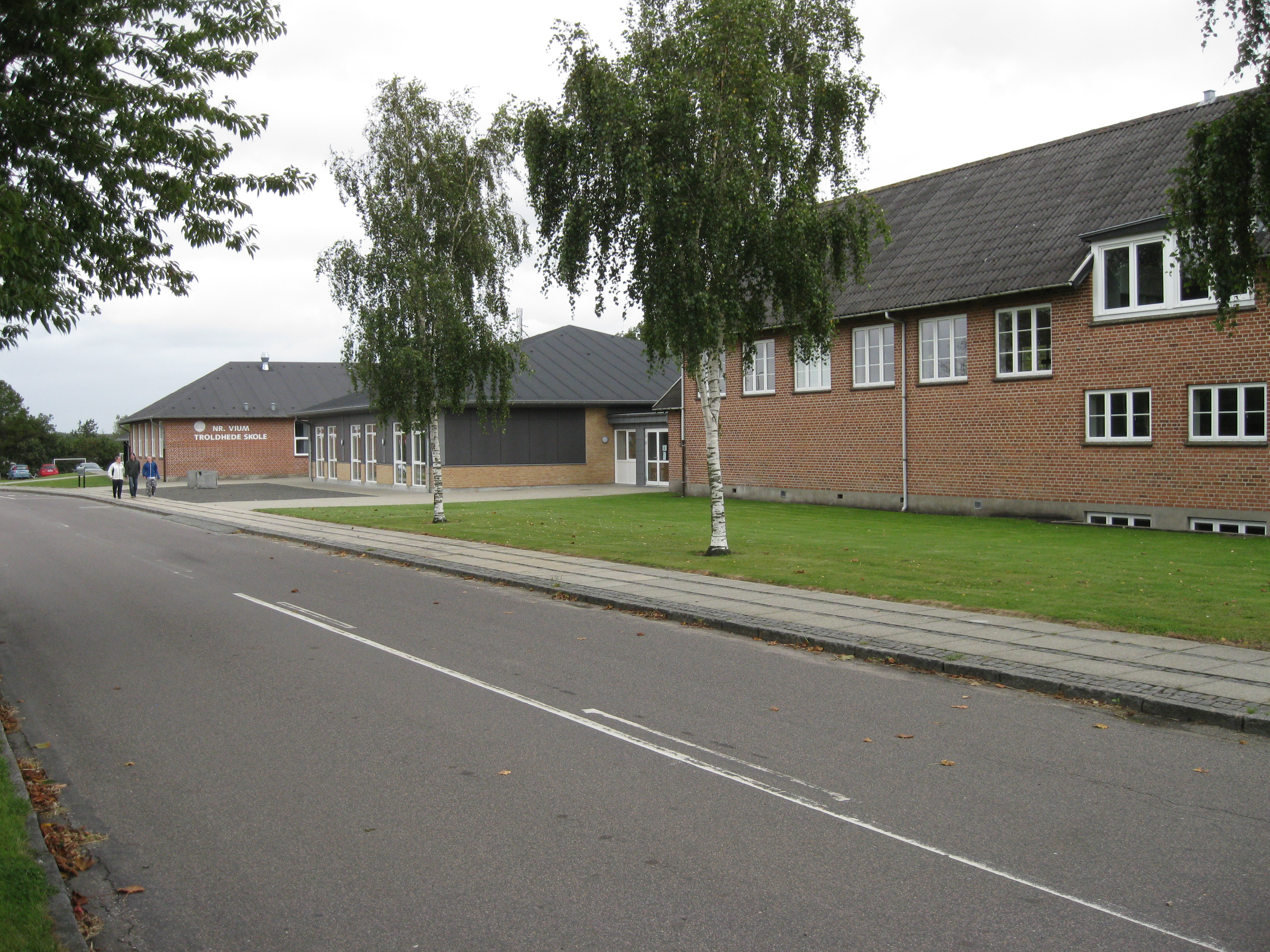
- Troldhede School

- Location in Central Denmark Region Troldhede (Denmark)
- Coordinates: 55°59′27″N 8°44′35″E
- Country: Denmark
- Region: Central Denmark "Midtjylland"
- Municipality: Ringkøbing-Skjern

Population (2026)
  - Total: 640

Troldhede is a small railway town, with a population of 640 (1 January 2026), in Ringkøbing-Skjern Municipality, Central Denmark Region in Denmark. It is located 16 km southeast of Videbæk, 11 km southwest of Kibæk, 26 km southwest of Herning and 19 km east of Skjern.

Troldhede is served by Troldhede railway station on the Skanderborg-Skjern railway line.

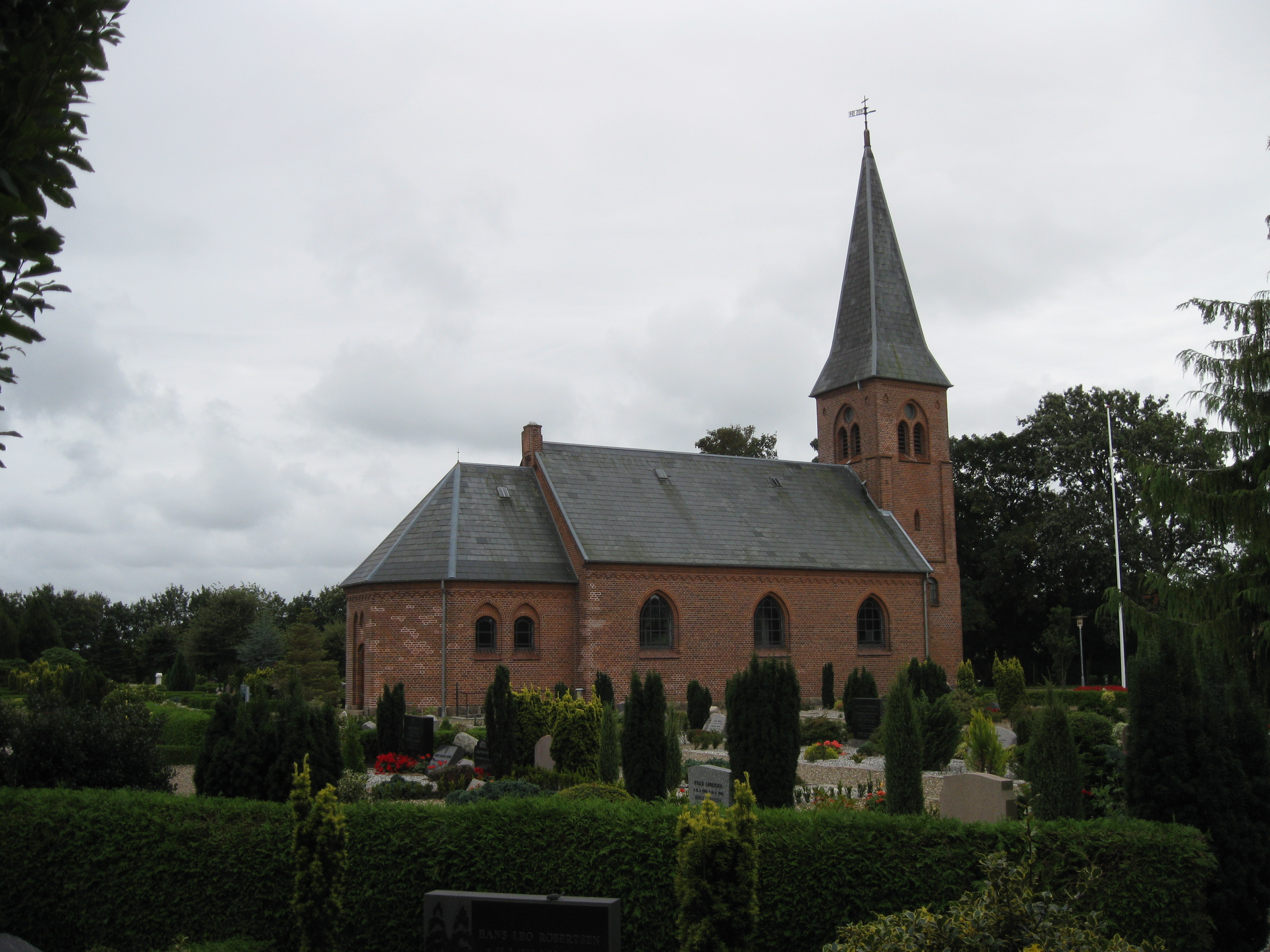
Troldhede Church

Troldhede Church is located in the southeastern part of the town.
