= Studsgård railway station =

Railway station in West Jutland, Denmark

Studsgård
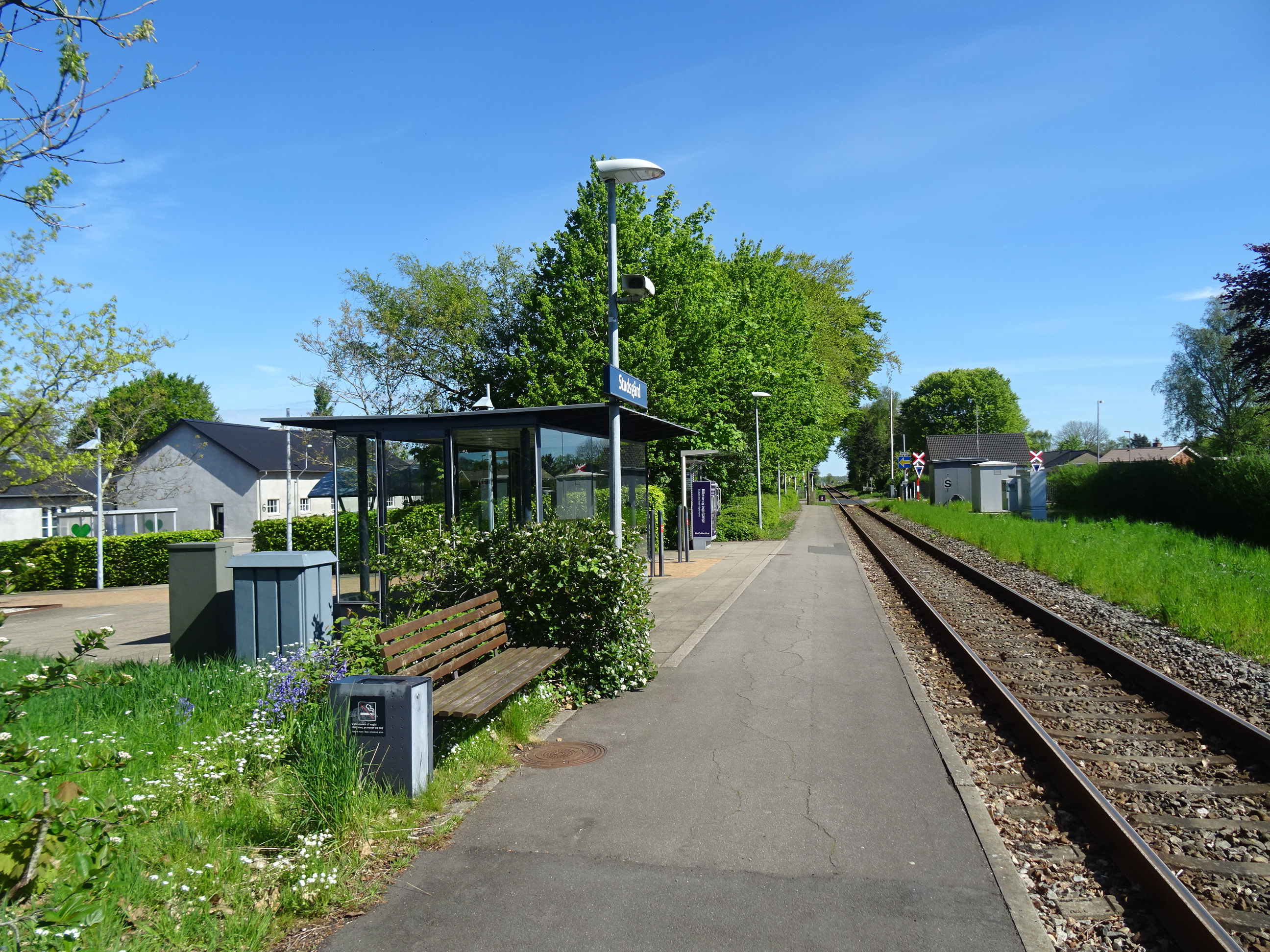
- Studsgård Station in 2024

General information
- Location: Momhøjvej 7 Studsgård, 7400 Herning; Herning Municipality; Denmark
- Coordinates: 56°05′29″N 8°54′36″E
- Elevation: 51.6 metres (169 ft)
- Owner: Banedanmark
- Line: Skanderborg–Skjern line
- Platforms: 1
- Tracks: 1
- Train operators: GoCollective

History
- Opened: 18 October 1881

Services
| Preceding station | GoCollective | Following station |
|---|---|---|
| Kibæk towards Skjern | Aarhus–Skjern Regional train | Herning Messecenter towards Aarhus Central |
Location

Studsgård station is a railway station serving the small railway town of Studsgård in West Jutland, Denmark.

Studsgård station is located on the Skanderborg–Skjern line. The station opened in 1881. It offers direct regional train services to Aarhus, Skjern and Esbjerg operated by GoCollective.

== Architecture ==
The station building from 1881 is designed by the Danish architect Niels Peder Christian Holsøe.

== See also ==
- List of railway stations in Denmark
