= Gudmund Hatt =

Danish archaeologist and cultural geographer

Aage Gudmund Hatt
- Born: 1 October 1884; Vildbjerg, Denmark
- Died: 27 January 1960 (aged 75)
- Education: Harvard University
- Scientific career
- Fields: Cultural geography
- Workplaces: University of Copenhagen

Professor Aage Gudmund Hatt (1 October 1884 – 27 January 1960) was a Danish archaeologist and cultural geographer. He was a professor of cultural geography at the University of Copenhagen from 1929 through 1947. Also an ethnologist, he was the first person to systematically inventory cultural similarities and differences amongst northern peoples.

== Early years ==
Hatt was born in Vildbjerg - before 2007 in Trehøje Municipality, from 2007 in Herning Municipality - Denmark, and studied there through 1904. His father was the local teacher. In 1905, he went to the United States and lived among the Cherokee Indians in Oklahoma for a year, which led him to study ethnography at Harvard University from 1906 to 1907. Returned to Denmark, he lectured on Native Americans in the United States and their former way of living, and began his studies under Hans Peder Steensby, ethnographer and professor of geography at the University of Copenhagen.

In 1911, he married the painter and ethnographer Emilie Demant, who had developed a keen interest in Sami people. In the same year, he began doctoral studies of Arctic people, including an ethnographic study of Lapland. For two years, between 1912 and 1914, Hatt and Demant visited northern Sweden several times, collecting ethnographic materials for the National Museum of Denmark. This research formed the basis for his 1914 doctoral thesis, Arctic skin clothing in Eurasia and America, when he noticed the cut in the clothing of Arctic peoples was based on whether they fished marine life or hunted in loose snow. From this, he theorized that two cultures developed in the Arctic, one that was land-locked and another that was coastal. In 1914, while a fellow of The American-Scandinavian Foundation, he studied at Columbia University.

== Career ==
In 1919, Hatt was hired to be the inspector at the National Museum of Denmark's Ethnography Department, and he remained at this civil service post for ten years. This position gave him the opportunity to participate in archaeological research at numerous settlement sites in central and western Jutland. Here, he was among the first in Danish archaeology who recognized that the ancient houses were not destroyed by fire which he recognized after excavating the areas between the houses, and not just the individual house sites, which was previously the custom. In 1922–23, he led an archaeological expedition to the Virgin Islands and Santo Domingo in the Caribbean. From 1923, Hatt was a lecturer in cultural geography at the University of Copenhagen, becoming a full professor in 1929.

Hatt became a public figure in the late 1930s through the early 1940s with his geopolitical analyses that communicated through radio, newspaper, books and journal articles. During the World War II German occupation of Denmark, Hatt joined the Danish-German reconciliation, possibly because he saw Germany as a natural and inevitable bulwark against Russian communism. After Denmark's liberation, Hatt was brought before an official court, was found to be engaged in ‘dishonourable national conduct’ during the German occupation, and was dismissed from his university chair, albeit with full pension. He became professionally more isolated, however, Hatt continued to publish more of his work in archeology. His last research was on the Danish Iron Age settlement in Fjand.

"Some ethnologists like to imagine local and independent origins for cultural phenomena. Others have a natural dislike for independent origins and prefer to search for cultural centers and the ways and roads of cultural transmission. The present writer belongs to the latter class." (Prof. G. Hatt)

—

Hatt served on the Royal Danish Geographical Society's council and was a member of the board of directors. He was a member of the American Ethnological Society, American Anthropological Association, Royal Danish Academy of Sciences and Letters, Société Royale des Lettres de Lund, Dansk Selskab for Oldtida, La Société Royale des Antiquaires du Nord, and Society des Americains de Paris. In 1915, he was awarded the Barnard Medal Award.

== Partial works ==
- "Om Brugen af Garvemidler hos Naturfolkene" (Geografisk Tidsskrift, Bind 21; 1911) (in Danish)
- "Om den kunstige Formning af Barnehovedet hos de skandinaviske Lapper" (Geografisk Tidsskrift, Bind 22; 1913) (in Danish)
- "Kyst- og Indlandskultur i det arktiske" (Geografisk Tidsskrift, Bind 23; 1915) (in Danish)
- "Rensdyrnomadismens Elementer" (Geografisk Tidsskrift, Bind 24; 1918) (in Danish)
- "Menneskeracerne og deres Udbredelsesmuligheder" (Geografisk Tidsskrift, Bind 31; 1928) (in Danish)
- "Menneskeracerne og deres Udbredelsesmuligheder (afslutning)" (Geografisk Tidsskrift, Bind 31; 1928) (in Danish)
- "Begrebet „Mellemeuropa"." (Geografisk Tidsskrift, Bind 32; 1929) (in Danish)
- "Oltidsagre" (Historie/Jyske Samlinger, Bind 5. række, 1; 1932) (in Danish)
