= Kibæk railway station =

Railway station in West Jutland, Denmark

Kibæk
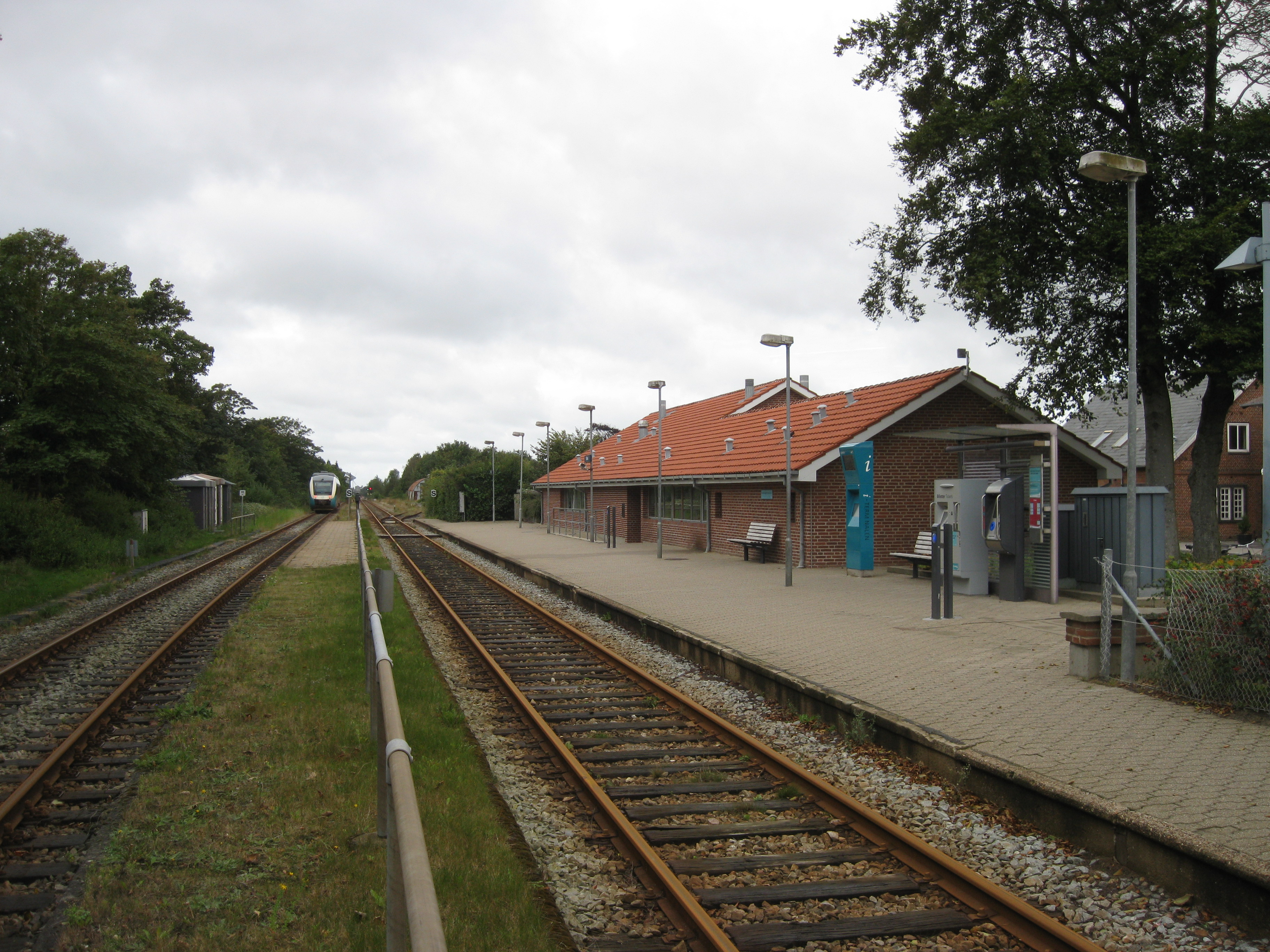
- Kibæk Station in 2012

General information
- Location: Jernbanegade 1; 6933 Kibæk; Herning Municipality; Denmark
- Coordinates: 56°01′56″N 8°51′07″E
- Elevation: 36.8 metres (121 ft)
- Owner: Banedanmark
- Line: Skanderborg–Skjern line
- Platforms: 2
- Tracks: 2
- Train operators: GoCollective

History
- Opened: 18 October 1881

Services
Preceding station	GoCollective	Following station
Troldhede towards Skjern	Aarhus–Skjern Regional train	Studsgård towards Aarhus Central
Location

Kibæk station is a railway station serving the small railway town of Kibæk in West Jutland, Denmark.

Kibæk station is located on the Skanderborg–Skjern line. The station opened in 1881. It offers direct regional train services to Aarhus, Skjern and Esbjerg operated by GoCollective.

== Architecture ==
The original station building from 1881 was designed by the Danish architect Niels Peder Christian Holsøe. It was torn down in 1977, and replaced by the current building from 1978.

== See also ==
- List of railway stations in Denmark
