= Borris railway station =

Railway station in West Jutland, Denmark

Borris
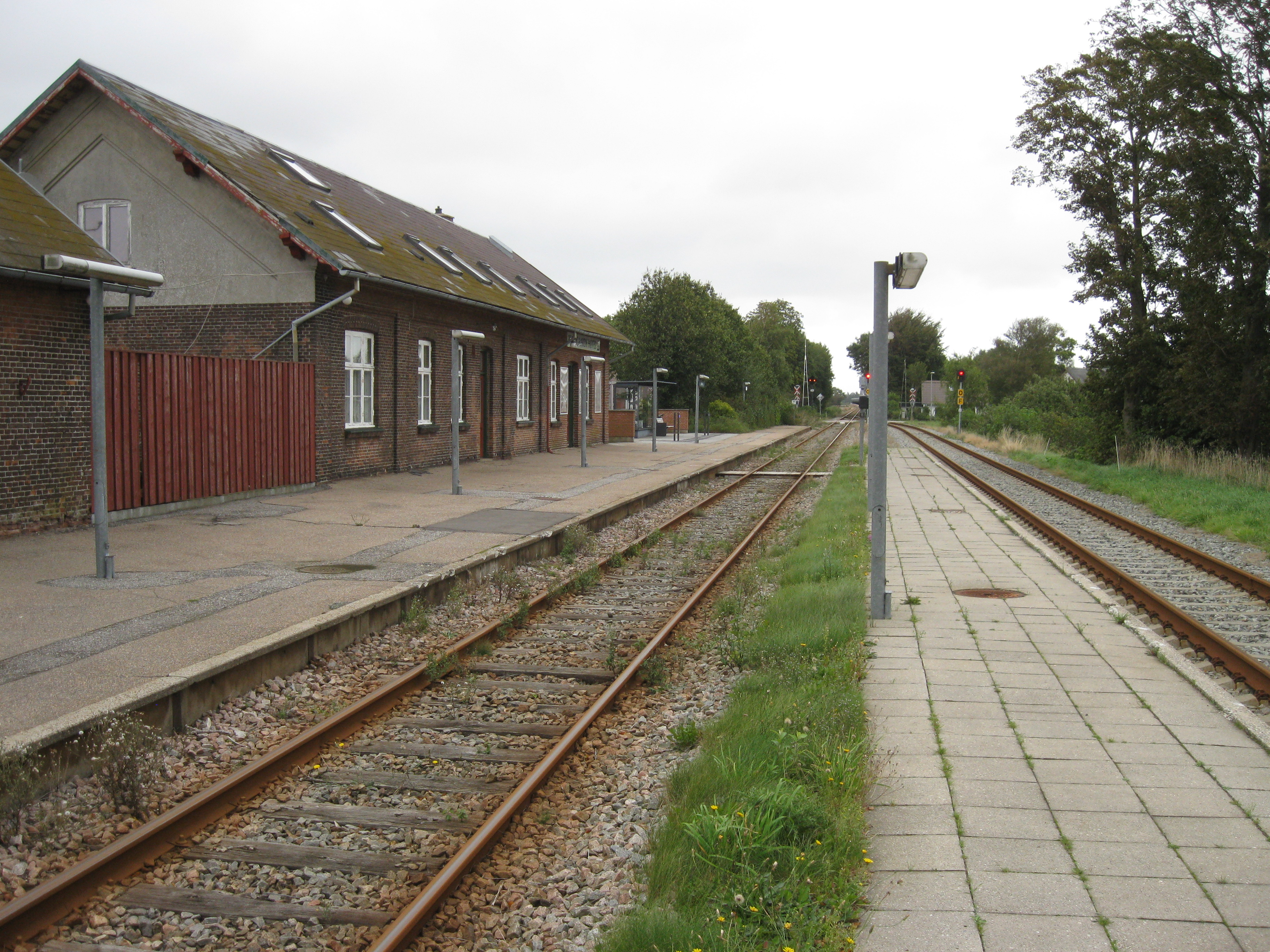
- Borris Station in 2012

General information
- Location: Borgergade 1B, Borris; 6900 Skjern; Ringkøbing-Skjern Municipality; Denmark
- Coordinates: 55°57′30″N 8°38′39″E
- Elevation: 14.9 metres (49 ft)
- Owner: DSB (station infrastructure); Banedanmark (rail infrastructure)
- Line: Skanderborg–Skjern
- Platforms: 2
- Tracks: 2
- Train operators: GoCollective

Construction
- Architect: N.P.C. Holsøe

Other information
- Website: Official website

History
- Opened: 18 October 1881

Services
Preceding station	GoCollective	Following station
Skjern Terminus	Aarhus–Skjern Regional train	Troldhede towards Aarhus Central
Location

Borris station is a railway station serving the small railway town of Borris east of the city of Skjern in West Jutland, Denmark.

Borris station is located on the Skanderborg–Skjern line. The station opened in 1881. It offers direct regional train services to Aarhus, Skjern and Struer operated by the private public transport operating company GoCollective.

== Architecture ==
The station building was designed by the Danish architect Niels Peder Christian Holsøe.

== See also ==
- List of railway stations in Denmark
