= Alexander Munksgaard =

Danish footballer (born 1997)

Personal information
- Full name: Alexander Munksgaard Nielsen
- Date of birth: 13 December 1997 (age 28)
- Place of birth: Vind, Denmark
- Height: 1.81 m (5 ft 11 in)
- Position: Right-back

Team information
- Current team: Sønderjyske
- Number: 3

Youth career
- Vind IF
- Vinding UIF
- –2010: Vildbjerg SF
- 2010–2015: Midtjylland

Senior career*
Years	Team	Apps	(Gls)
2015–2018	Midtjylland	14	(0)
2016–2017	→ Lyngby (loan)	10	(0)
2019–2023	AGF	89	(1)
2023	→ Aalesund (loan)	15	(0)
2023–2024	Gorica	28	(0)
2024–2026	Baník Ostrava	15	(1)
2026	Kristiansund	15	(0)
2026–	Sønderjyske	7	(1)

International career
2013	Denmark U16	3	(0)
2013–2014	Denmark U17	11	(0)
2014–2015	Denmark U18	7	(0)
2015–2016	Denmark U19	11	(0)
2016	Denmark U20	2	(0)
2018–2019	Denmark U21	4	(0)
- * Club domestic league appearances and goals as of 12:46, 21 October 2026 (UTC)

Alexander Munksgaard Nielsen (born 13 December 1997) is a Danish professional footballer for Sønderjyske. He has represented Denmark at under-21 level.

A product of Midtjylland's youth academy, Munksgaard made his professional debut in July 2015. He had a brief spell on loan with Lyngby during the 2016–17 season before returning to Midtjylland. He joined AGF in 2019.

== Club career ==
As a youth player, Munksgaard first played for Vind IF, then Vinding UIF, and finally in Vildbjerg SF, before being scouted to the Midtjyland youth academy in 2010. Munksgaard made his debut in the Danish Superliga on 24 July 2015, where he played the entire match in a 1–2 victory over SønderjyskE. On 31 August 2016, it was announced that Munksgaard signed a one-season loan deal with Lyngby Boldklub valid for the 2016–17 season. He made his league debut for Lyngby in a 1–0 win over Brøndby IF. After the end of the loan, Munksgaard returned to Midtjylland.

On 4 January 2019, Munksgaard signed with AGF on a five-year contract, reuniting him with his manager at Lyngby, David Nielsen. He made his debut for the club on 8 February in a 2–0 win over Esbjerg fB. He scored his first goal for the club on 11 November 2019 in a 4–2 win over SønderjyskE.

On 2 August 2023, AGF announced that they have sold Munksgaard to Croatian club Gorica.

On 3 September 2024, Munksgaard signed a three-year contract with Czech club Baník Ostrava. On 30 January 2026, Munksgaard left the club after mutually terminating his contract with the club.

== International career ==
Munksgaard has played on all Denmark youth national teams from under-16 to under-21 level, where until January 2019 he played a total of 36 youth national matches. He made his debut on the under-21 team in the friendly match against England on 20 November 2018.

== Honours ==
Midtjylland

- Danish Superliga: 2017–18
- Danish Cup: 2018–19

AGF

- The Atlantic Cup: 2020
