= Emilie Demant Hatt =

Danish artist (1873–1958)

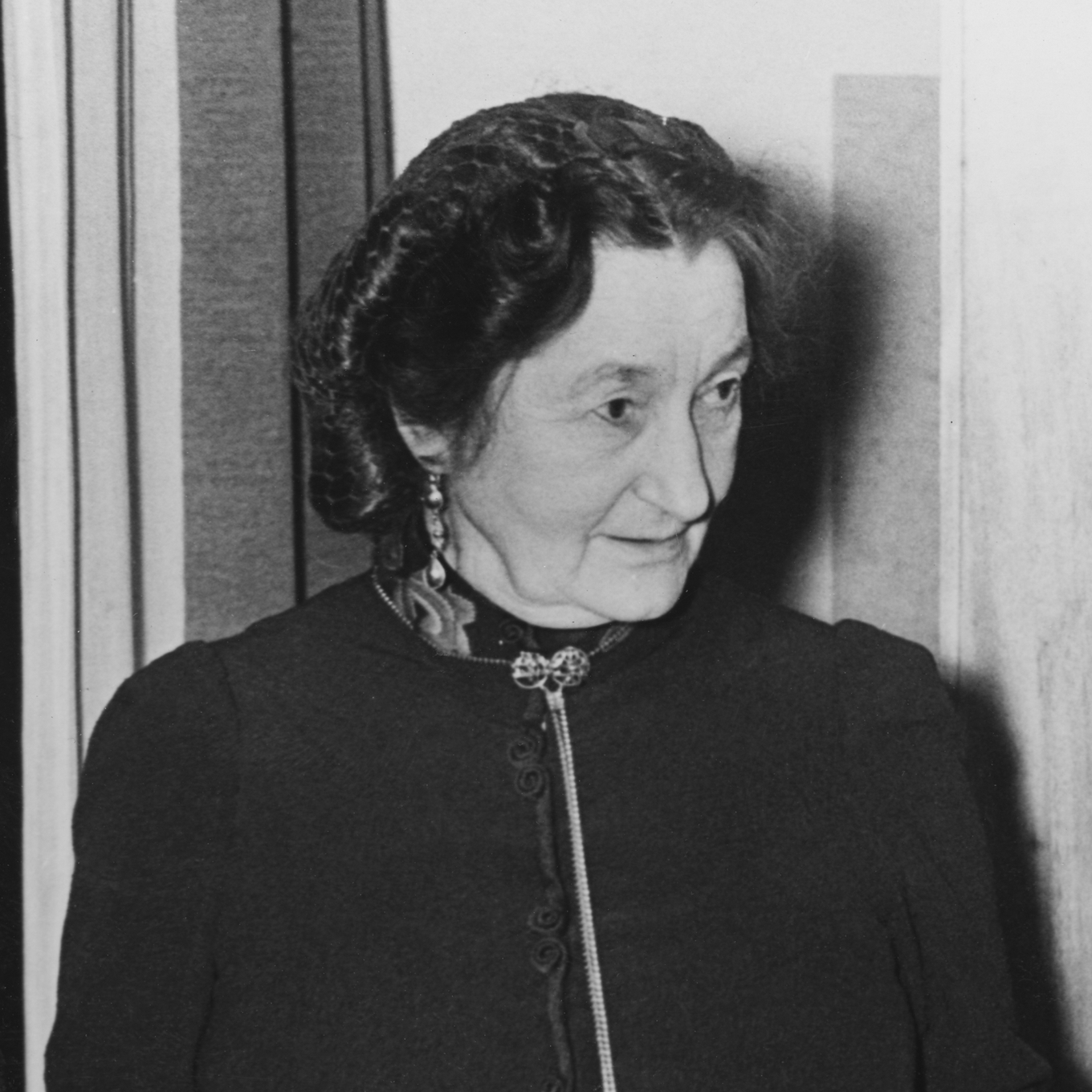
- Emilie Demant Hatt in 1940 at a Nordiska museet event.
- Born: January 21, 1873; Selde, in northern Jutland, Denmark
- Died: December 4, 1958 (aged 85)
- Occupations: Painter, writer, ethnographer
- Writing career
- Notable work: "With the Lapps in the High Mountains"
- Website: www.emiliedemanthatt.com

Emilie Demant Hatt (sometimes Emilie Demant-Hatt, or Emilie Demant; née Emilie Demant Hansen) (21 January 1873 – 4 December 1958) was a Danish artist, writer, ethnographer, and folklorist. Her area of interest and expertise was the culture and way of life of Sámi people.

== Early years ==
Emilie Demant Hansen was born in 1873 to a merchant's family in Selde, by the Limfjord in northern Jutland, Denmark. From the age of fourteen to seventeen she had a romantic relationship with Carl Nielsen whom she met in 1887 in Selde. Expecting to become engaged, Nielsen had a psychological crisis over their relationship. Nielsen was living at the time with Emilie's uncle and aunt in Copenhagen. Emilie Demant Hatt went on to preserve several original early music manuscripts of Nielsen's.

From 1898 to 1906, she studied painting and drawing in Copenhagen with Emilie Mundt and Marie Luplau, at the Women's Academy of Art, a school within the Royal Danish Academy of Fine Arts.

While an art student, she changed her last name to Demant. In 1904, Demant and her sister took a train trip to northern Scandinavia. It was here on the iron ore train in Swedish Lapland that they met a Sami wolf hunter, Johan Turi (1854–1936). The encounter had a dramatic effect on Demant who was very interested in Sami culture and their way of life. While relying on an interpreter, Turi told Demant that he wanted to write a book about "Lapps," while Demant stated, “I have always wanted to be a nomad.” Demant spent the next several years learning the Northern Sami language at the University of Copenhagen with the linguist Vilhelm Thomsen while continuing her painting studies.

== Career ==
In 1907, she returned to northern Scandinavia and lived in a Sami siida in the Swedish mountains outside Kiruna with Sari and Aslak Turi, Johan Turi's brother. She migrated with them and other Sami in the winter and spring of 1907 and 1908, to Jukkasjärvi and from Karesuando to Tromsdalen, where she spent the summer of 1908. Though untrained as an ethnographer, she kept a journal, took photographs, and sketched and painted what she saw. While male anthropologists had visited this area previously, Demant was the first woman to have lived so closely with the Sámi. Demant was also the first investigator to discover the Sami mothers perform infant head moulding.

In the fall of 1908, Demant spent 6–8 weeks with Johan Turi in a mountain cabin where she assisted Turi with his book Muitalus sámiid birra ("The Book of Lapps"). She took the notebooks in which Turi had written his book in Sami back with her to Denmark. She then transcribed the text, translated it into Danish, and organized it. She was assisted by Anders Pedersen and Vilhelm Thomsen. The book was funded by the Swedish mining director, Hjalmar Lundbohm. Bogen om lapperne ("Johan Turi’s Book of Lapland") was published in 1910 in a bilingual Sami-Danish edition in 1910, and in 1931 as an English language edition.

Demant made another ethnographic visit to Sweden in 1910, where she lived in Glen with the South Sami couple Marta and Nils Nilsson. In 1913, she published Med lapperne i højfjeldet (translation: "With the Lapps in the High Mountains"), an account of Sami customs based on her one-year nomadic travels in 1907–08.

Demant Hatt painted all her life and exhibited her works at art exhibitions. She wrote additional works about the Sami and produced a series of paintings focused on Lapland. The collection is located at Stockholm's Nordic Museum. Other Demant-Hatt paintings are located at the Skive Museum of Art. A substantial part of the Sami costume collection in the National Museum of Denmark's Ethnography Department was collected by Dement Hatt during the period of 1915–1924.

In 1915, she was awarded the Barnard Medal Award. She was awarded the 1940 Arthur Hazelius medal in Stockholm for her Sami research. She was a member of the Geographical Society of Finland.

The American translator and editor Barbara Sjoholm began researching Emilie Demant Hatt's life around 2002. She has since translated two of Demant Hatt's works, With the Lapps in the High Mountains (2013) and By the Fire (2019). Sjoholm published a biography of Demant Hatt in 2017: Black Fox: A Life of Emilie Demant Hatt, Artist and Ethnographer.

== Personal life ==
Demant had a close relationship and friendship with the Swedish geologist and chemist Hjalmar Lundbohm whom she met in Jukkasjärvi in 1907. Her artist friends were Christine Swane and Olga Lau, with whom she attended the Royal Academy of Art.

In September 1911, she married Aage Gudmund Hatt, a professor of cultural geography at the University of Copenhagen.

Emilie Demant Hatt wrote her autobiography, Foraarsbølger ("Spring Torrents") 1949. On her death in 1958, the manuscript was submitted to the Royal Danish Library and was subject to a 25-year rule. It was forgotten until 2002, when Johan Fellow discovered in the archives. It was published in 2002. Two novels by Barbara Sjoholm based on the relationship between Carl Nielsen and Emilie Demant Hatt, Fossil Island and a sequel The Former World, were published in 2015. Fossil Island received best Indie Award from the Historical Novel Society.

== Selected works ==
- (1913), Med Lapperne i høfjeldet (Danish language)
- (1918), Die lappländischen Nomaden in Skandinavien
- (1920), Lappish Texts written by Johan Turi and Per Turi. With the cooperation of K. D. Wiklund, edited by Emilie Demant-Hatt (English language)
- (1922), Ved Ilden : eventyr og historier fra Lapland (Danish language)
- (2013) With the Lapps in the High Mountains, University of Wisconsin Press
- (2015) Fossil Island and The Former World, Cedar Street Editions
- (2017) Black Fox: A Life of Emilie Demant Hatt, Artist and Ethnographer (University of Minnesota Press)
- (2019) By the Fire: Sami Folktales and Legends, University of Minnesota Press
