= Troldhede railway station =

Railway station in West Jutland, Denmark

Troldhede
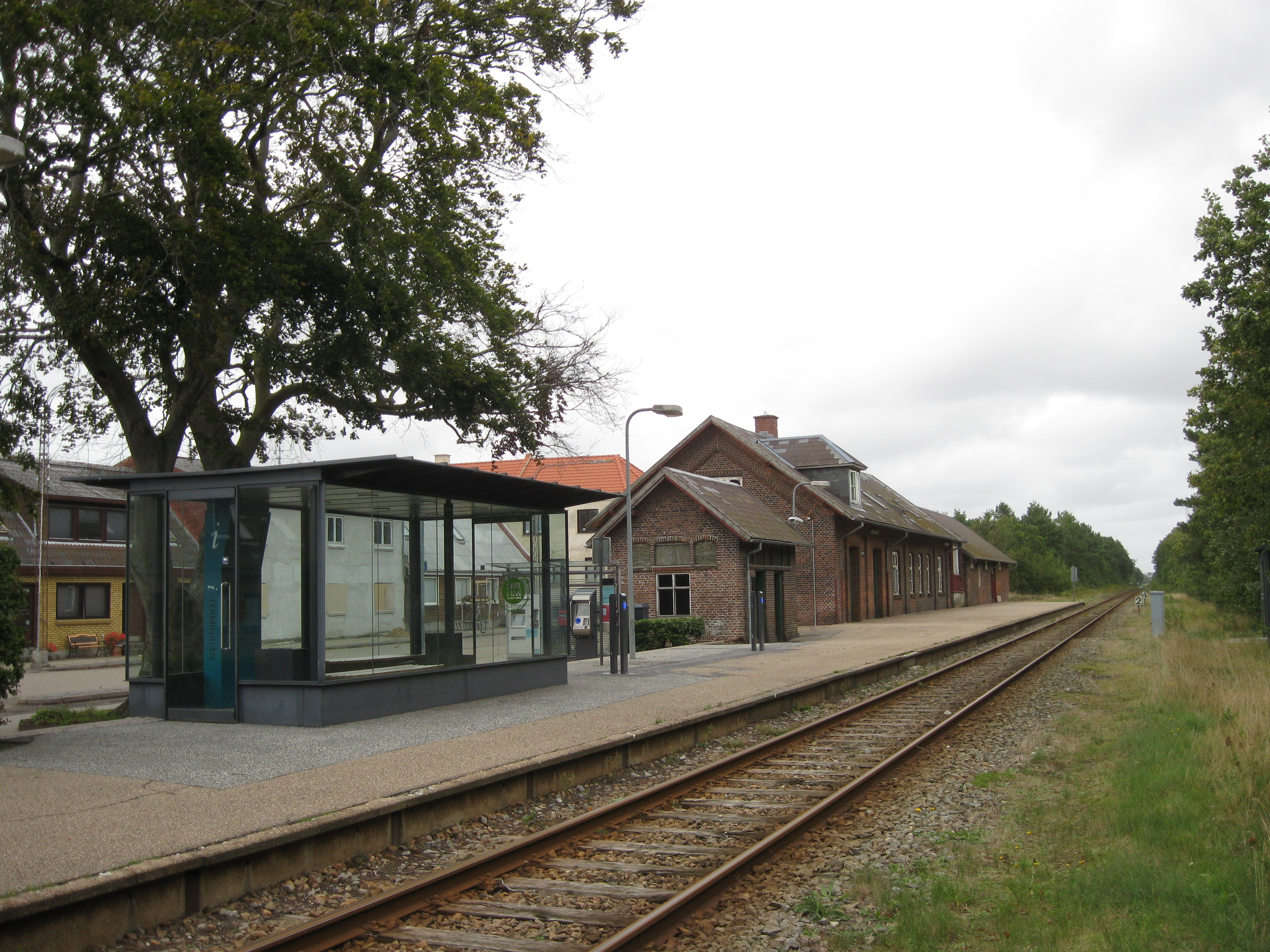
- Troldhede Station in 2012

General information
- Location: Jernbanegade 2 Troldhede, 6920 Videbæk; Ringkøbing-Skjern Municipality; Denmark
- Coordinates: 55°59′27″N 8°44′43″E
- Elevation: 27.0 metres (88.6 ft)
- Owner: Banedanmark
- Line: Skanderborg–Skjern line
- Platforms: 1
- Tracks: 1
- Train operators: GoCollective

Construction
- Architect: N.P.C. Holsøe

History
- Opened: 18 October 1881

Services
| Preceding station | GoCollective | Following station |
|---|---|---|
| Borris towards Skjern | Aarhus–Skjern Regional train | Kibæk towards Aarhus Central |
Location

Troldhede station is a railway station serving the small railway town of Troldhede in West Jutland, Denmark.

Troldhede station is located on the Skanderborg–Skjern line. The station opened in 1881. From 1917 to 1968 it was the northern terminus of the Troldhede-Kolding-Vejen railway line from Troldhede to Kolding. It offers direct regional train services to Aarhus, Skjern and Esbjerg operated by GoCollective.

== Architecture ==
The station building was designed by the Danish architect Niels Peder Christian Holsøe.

== See also ==
- List of railway stations in Denmark
