= Vind, Denmark =

Vind
- Village
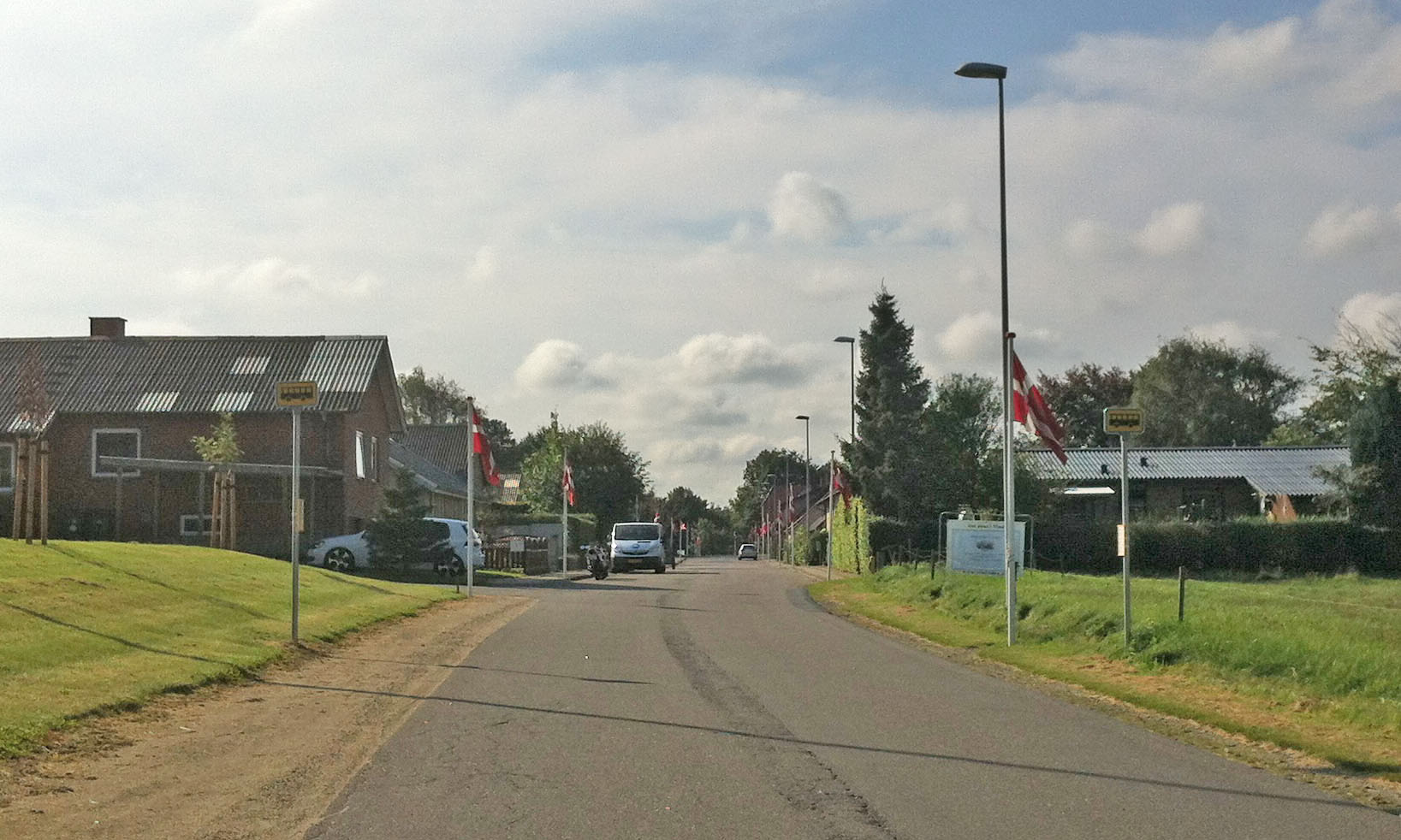
- Main street

- Location in Denmark Vind (Central Denmark Region)
- Coordinates: 56°15′23″N 8°33′50″E
- Country: Denmark
- Region: Midtjylland
- Municipality: Herning
- First mentioned: 1300s as Wind

Area
  - Urban: 0.3 km^{2} (0.12 sq mi)

Population (1. January 2022)
  - Urban: 207
  - Urban density: 690/km^{2} (1,800/sq mi)
- Time zone: UTC+1 (CET)
  - Summer (DST): UTC+1 (CEST)
- Postal code: 7500

Vind is a village in Denmark, located about 14 km (8.7 mi) south of Holstebro. The town is the westernmost settlement in Herning Municipality, and is therefore a part of the Central Denmark Region. It has a population of 207 (1 January 2022). Between 1970 and 2006, Vind was part of Trehøje Municipality.

== History ==
Vind is known by the name Wind in "Ribe Oldemoder"'s church list from the 14th century.

In 1682, Wind consisted of five farms. The form of cultivation was pasture.

=== Railroad ===
Vind had a train station on the Ringkøbing-Ørnhøj-Holstebro Line, which existed from 1925 to 1961. On the stretch between Vind and Sørvad, the worst accident in the line's history occurred. On 22 March 1947, two wagons collided in dense fog. Two boys who had been allowed to stay in one of the locomotives died.

The station building of Vind was designed by architect Ulrik Plesner. It is preserved on Granstien 4. The railway route is preserved as a gravel road between the town of Vind and Voldsted Bjerg to the south. To the east, between the town and Vind Plantage, smaller sections of the route have been preserved, interrupted by cultivated fields, but through the plantation and all the way to Sørvad, the route has been preserved.

=== School ===
Vind School, which was located 1 km north of the church and 2½ km northwest of the city, was closed in 2011. At the time of closing it had around 50 primary education students. A plan to establish a free school never materialised, which meant that the students were moved to the school in Sørvad.

The former school buildings now house a nature and activity center run by the non-profit association Vindkraften. The buildings are used for camp schools, courses, private and other purposes.

== Notable residents ==
- Alexander Munksgaard (born 1997, in Vind) a Danish professional footballer
