= Aulum-Haderup Municipality =

Former municipality in Denmark

Coordinates: 56°020′N 8°055′E

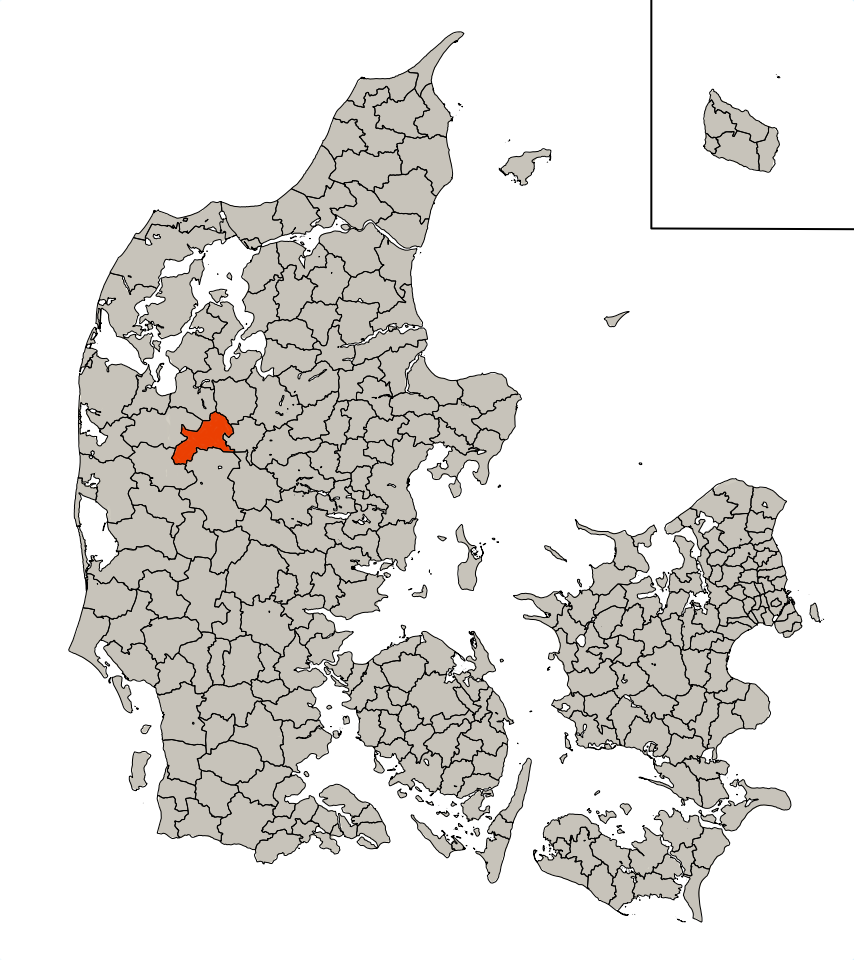
Aulum-Haderup Municipality's location in Denmark, 1970–2006.

Aulum-Haderup was a Danish municipality (Danish, kommune) in the former Ringkjøbing County in Jutland which existed from 1970 until 2007. Today, the region is part of Herning Municipality within Region Midtjylland.

== History ==
Aulum-Haderup municipality was established as a result of the 1970 Danish municipal reform. The main town and the site of its municipal council was the town of Aulum. By 2005, the municipality covered an area of 247 km^{2}, and had a total population of 6,730. Its final mayor was Christian Dam Larsen, a member of the Venstre (Liberal Party) political party.

The municipality ceased to exist as the result of The Municipality Reform of 2007). On January 1, 2007 it was merged with former Herning, Trehøje, and Aaskov municipalities to form the new Herning municipality. This created a municipality with an area of 1,336 km^{2} and a total population of 82,935 (2005).
