= Borris, Ringkøbing-Skjern =

Borris
- Town
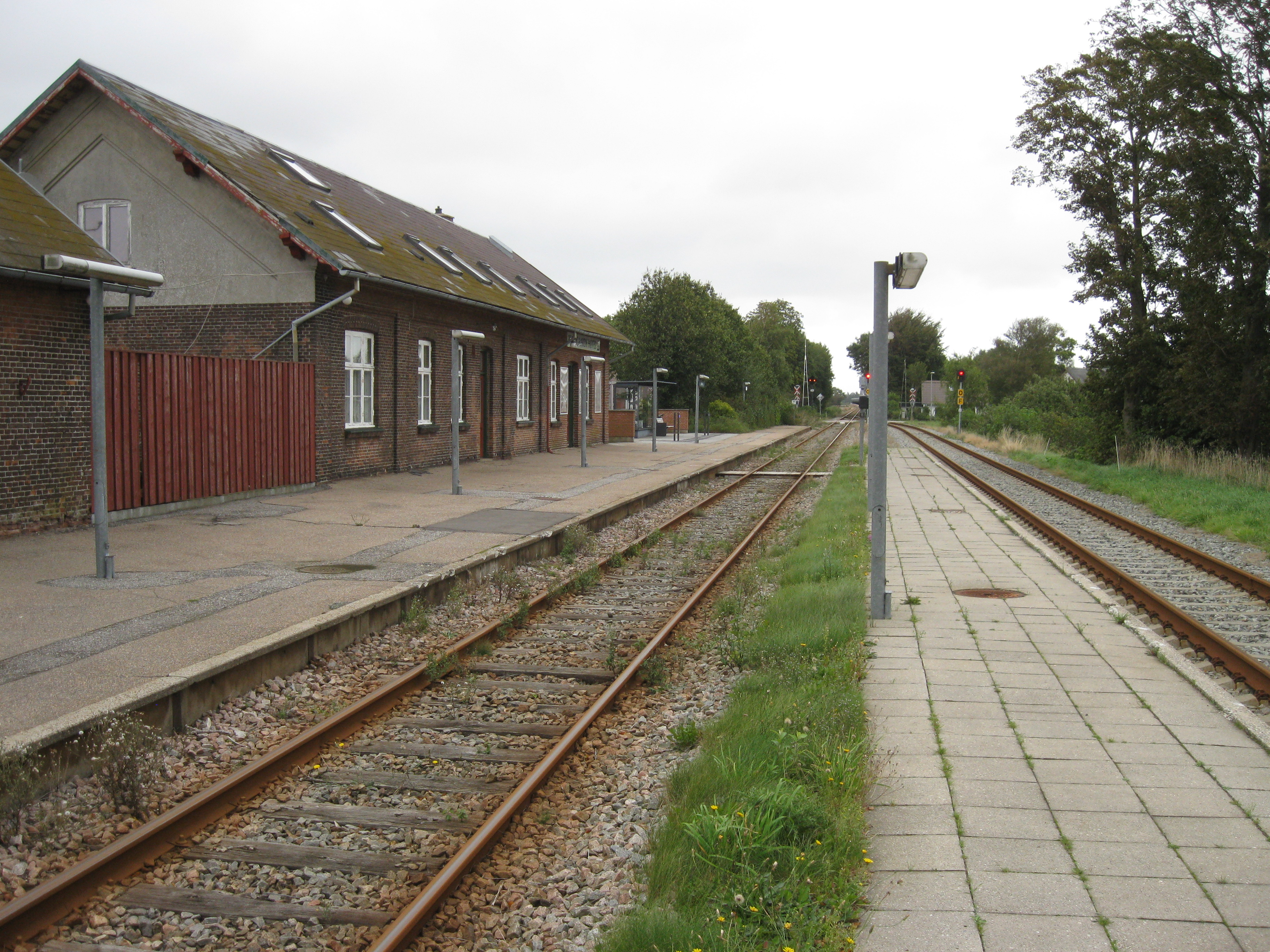
- Borris railway station

- Location in Central Denmark Region Borris (Denmark)
- Coordinates: 55°57′31″N 8°38′47″E
- Country: Denmark
- Region: Central Denmark
- Municipality: Ringkøbing-Skjern

Population (2026)
  - Total: 869
- Time zone: UTC+1 (CET)
  - Summer (DST): UTC+2 (CEST)

Borris is a small railway town in Ringkøbing-Skjern Municipality, Denmark, with a population of 869 (1 January 2026). It is located 12 km east of Skjern, 12 km northeast of Tarm, 9 km west of Sønder Felding and 35 km southwest of Herning.

Borris is served by Borris railway station on the Skanderborg–Skjern railway line.

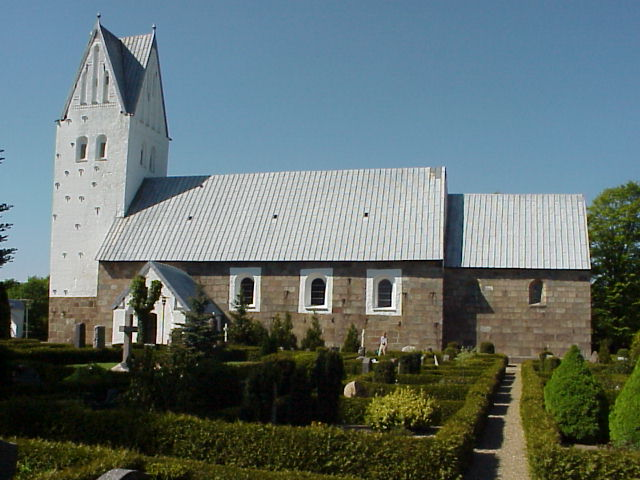
Borris Church

Borris Church is located in the town.

Borris Skydeterræn (Borris Shooting Ranges) is situated south of the town on the largest heath in Denmark.
