= Aaskov Municipality =

Former municipality in Denmark

Coordinates: 55.370222°N 10.715558°E

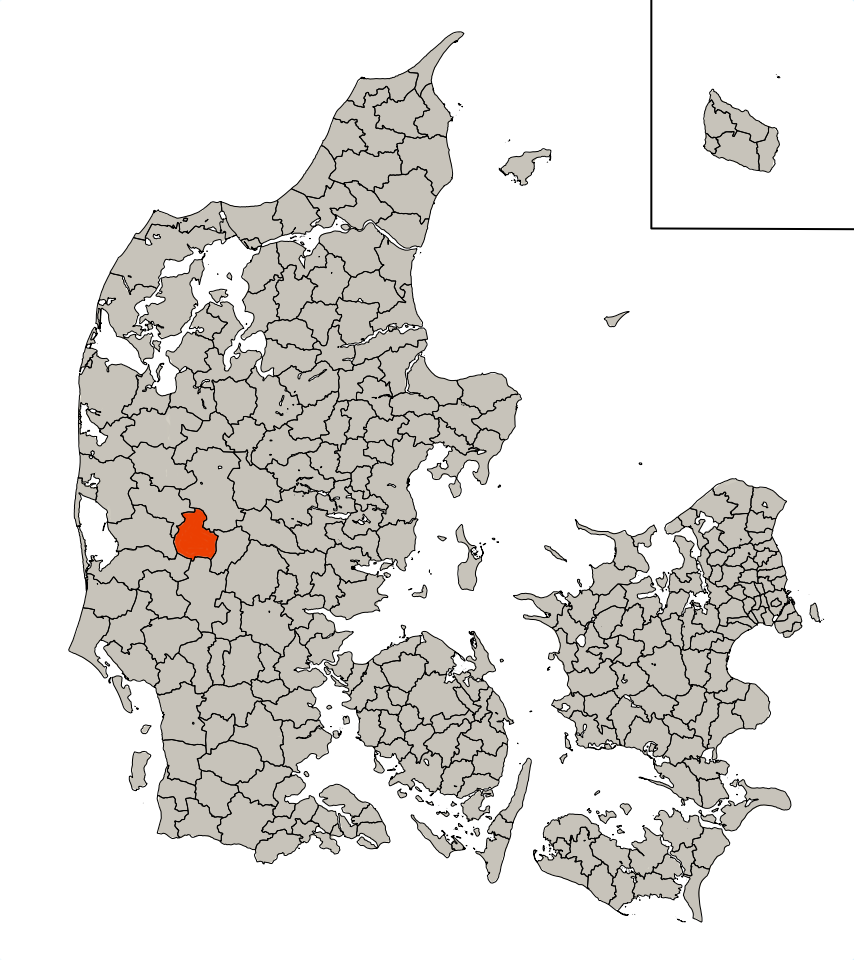
Aaskov Municipality's location in Denmark.

Until 1 January 2007 Aaskov Municipality was a municipality (Danish, kommune) in Ringkøbing County on the Jutland peninsula in west Denmark. The municipality covered an area of 239 km^{2}, and had a total population of 6,999 (2005). Its latest mayor was Jørgen Jørgensen, a member of the Venstre (Liberal Party) political party. The main town and the site of its municipal council was the town of Kibæk. Another town in the municipality was Sdr. Felding.

Aaskov municipality ceased to exist as the result of Kommunalreformen ("The Municipality Reform" of 2007). On January 1, 2007 it was merged with former Aulum-Haderup, Herning, and Trehøje municipalities to form the new Herning municipality. This created a municipality with an area of 1,336 km^{2} and a total population of 82,935 (2005). The new municipality belongs to the Region Midtjylland ("Mid-Jutland Region").
