= Skarrild =

- Town
- Location in Denmark Skarrild (Central Denmark Region)
- Coordinates: 55°58′42″N 08°53′51″E
- Country: Denmark
- Region: Central Denmark (Midtjylland)
- Municipality: Herning

Population (2026-01-01)
  - Total: 291
- Time zone: UTC+1 (CET)
  - Summer (DST): UTC+2 (CEST)

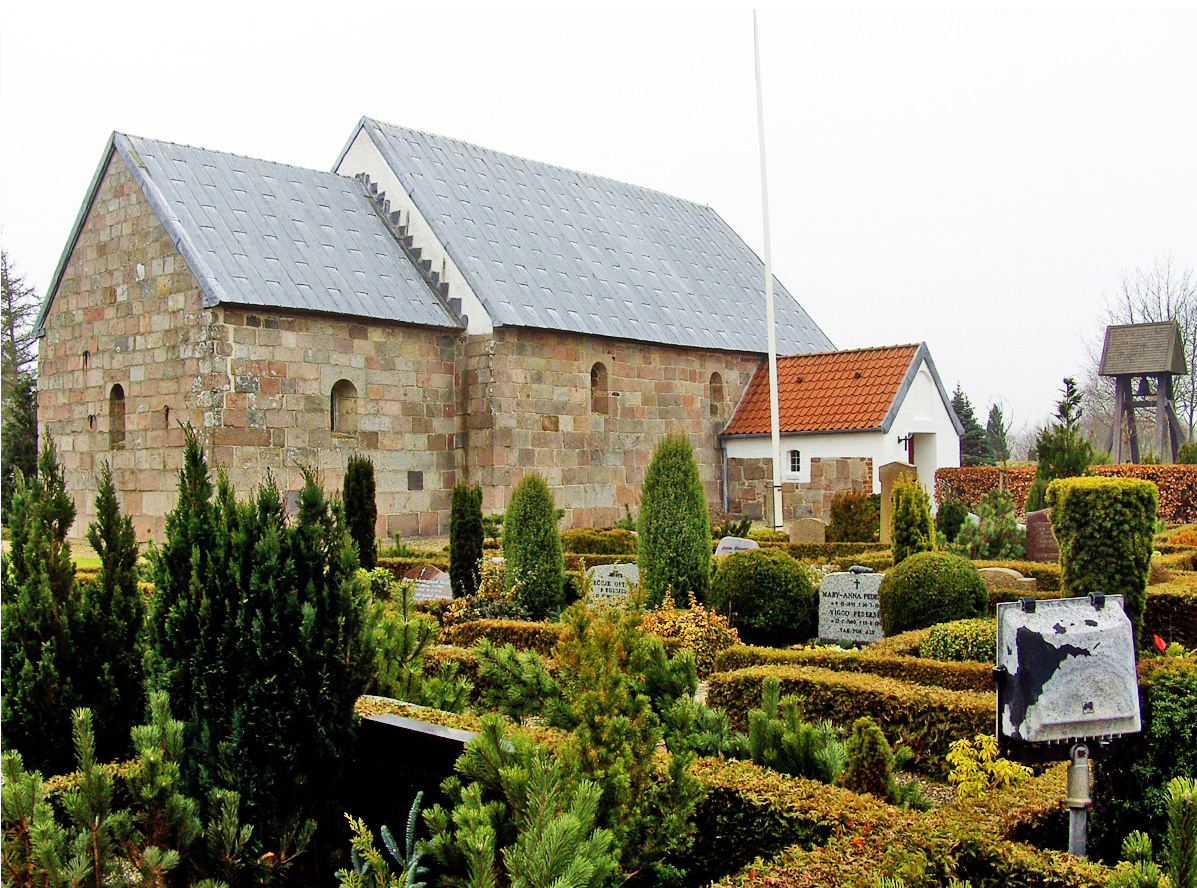
Skarrild church

Skarrild is a village (Danish: landsby) in Herning Municipality (Danish, kommune) in Central Denmark Region (Danish, Region Midtjylland), a part of the Jutland peninsula in northern Denmark. It is notable as the location of the Danish Blues Guitar Festival and a memorial to RAF flyers who died there in 1944.

In 1944, it was the site of a deadly air skirmish during World War II near its Romanesque church, at which there is a memorial to the Royal Air Force fliers who died there. On 27 August 1944, a seven-member RAF crew in a Lancaster ME650 from East Kirkby were killed in a crash when a German plane shot it down.

The Danish Folk, Blues, and Ragtime Guitar Festival in Skarrild attracts many international entertainers, including Thomasina Winslow.
