= Sønder Felding =

- Town
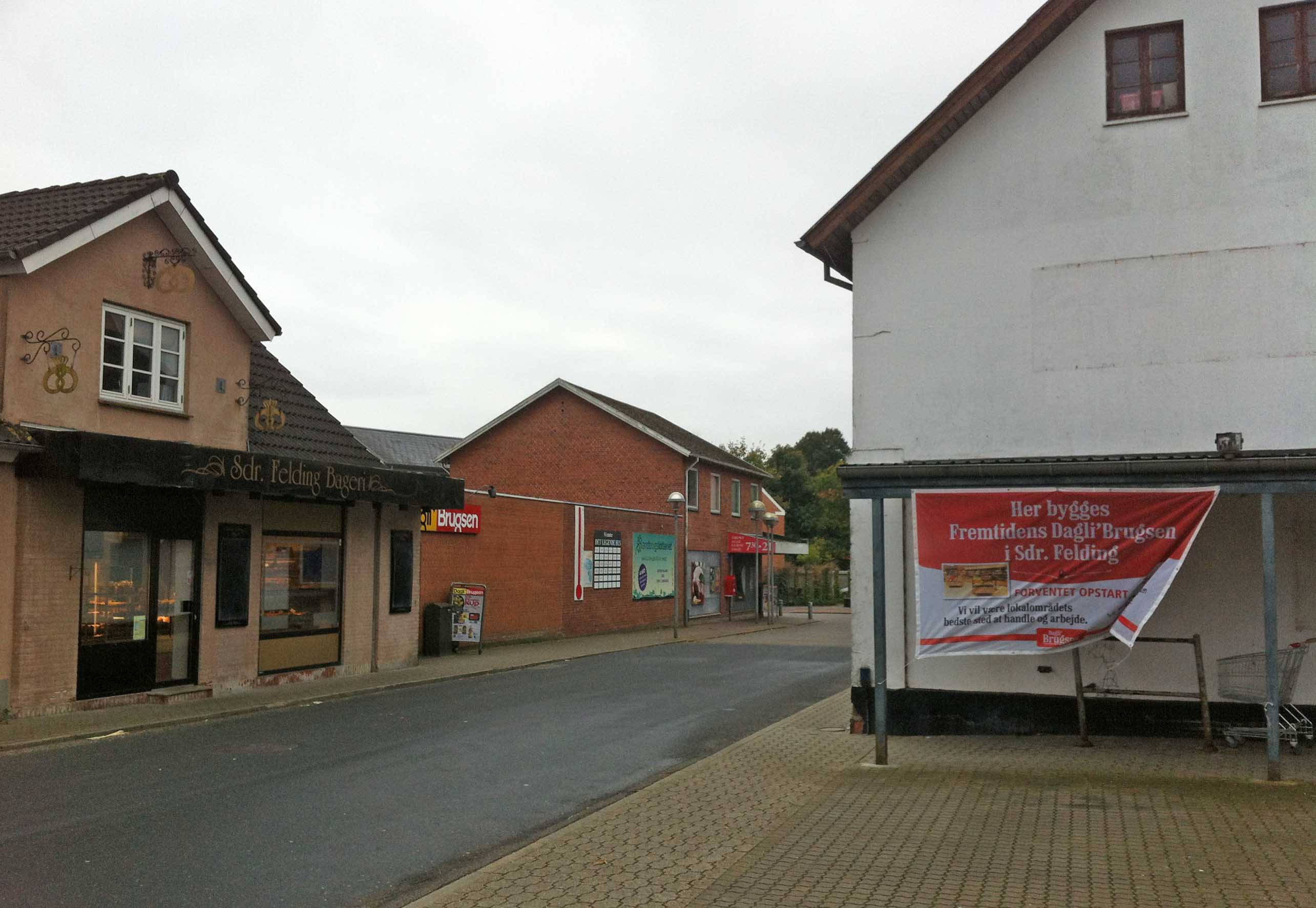
- Dagli'Brugsen in Sønder Felding

- Location in Denmark Sønder Felding (Central Denmark Region)
- Coordinates: 55°56′35″N 8°47′15″E
- Country: Denmark
- Region: Midtjylland
- Municipality: Herning
- First mentioned: 1340s as Fillingh

Area
  - Total: 1.32 km^{2} (0.51 sq mi)

Population (1. January 2026)
  - Total: 1,385
  - Density: 1,050/km^{2} (2,720/sq mi)
- Time zone: UTC+1 (CET)
  - Summer (DST): UTC+1 (CEST)
- Postal code: 7280
- Website: https://sdrfelding.com/

Sønder Felding often abbreviated to Sdr. Felding, is a town in Herning Municipality, Central Denmark Region, Denmark. Located about 20 km (12 mi) east of Skjern, the town has a population of 1,385 (1 January 2026).

== Etymology ==
The oldest known source for the name Felding is from around 1325, in which the form Fillingh appears. In later evidence, the form Fillingh (1388) and other forms such as Fyllyng (1425) and Felling (1580) are found. The name is composed of the word fjeld, which in Old Danish has the meaning "outfield, uncultivated area", and the suffix -ing, which in place names indicates that it is a place or area. The name thus refers to a place or area in the outfield. The leading Sønder has been used since the 1680s to separate the name from Nørre Felding near Holstebro.

== History ==
As late as the 1870s, the buildings in Sønder Felding consisted only of the medieval church, the rectory and a school. In 1893 this was supplemented by a mission house. But after the inauguration of the Troldhede-Kolding-Vejen railway in 1917 established a station a little west of Sønder Felding Church, the settlement grew together with its neighbouring villages Nederby and Fruerby, and the three villages gradually came to form a whole under the name Sønder Felding.

In the following decades, the town grew and got a municipal office, cinema, assembly house, central school and stadium. In 1971, the city also got a sports hall. The railway closed in 1968.

== Geography ==
The town is located on the heath plain just south of Skovbjerg Bakkeø. Skjern River meanders through the town and has been regulated several times, including at the end of the 19th century with the construction of the Skjern Å Nørrekanal between Arnborg and Borris.

== Culture ==
Sdr. Felding Hallen (Sdr. Felding Hall) was inaugurated in 1971 and after expansion in 2016 is called Det Legende Hus, which means 'The Playing House'. In addition to the sports hall, there is a multi-purpose indoor arena. Sdr. Felding Gymnastik og Idrætsforening (SFGIF) has around 800 active members and offers football, handball, gymnastics, badminton, senior sports, volleyball and gym.

Sønder Felding Højskole went bankrupt in 2004, and in 2006 Sdr. Feldings Efterskole established in the folk high school's buildings. The school has room for 76 students, and its purpose is to help the academically weak at their own pace.

Dagmar Bio started in 1954 as a commercial cinema, when the city's contractor built a cinema hall in connection with his family's house. It was most recently expanded in 1967 and still has room for 129 guests. Now it is run by a cinema club that shows movies once a week. It is also used for concerts, art exhibitions and association events in addition to being rented by private individuals.

=== Å-festival ===
Sønder Felding is the host town for the annual Å-festival, which is Denmark's largest Christian music festival. It takes place every year during Pentecost on the football pitches north of the city, where over 3,000 people, mainly young people, gather to hear Christian music from Denmark and abroad. The festival is atypical in that it is funded solely by voluntary donations, making it free to attend. The festival is organised by an independent association with roots in the Church Association for the Inner Mission in Denmark and a large number of local volunteers.

== Notable residents ==
- Niels Holst-Sørensen (born 1922, in Sønder Felding) a Danish former athlete and air force officer
- Arman Taranis, (born 2001, in Sønder Felding) a Danish-Bosnian professional footballer
