= Studsgård =

Studsgaard
- Railway town
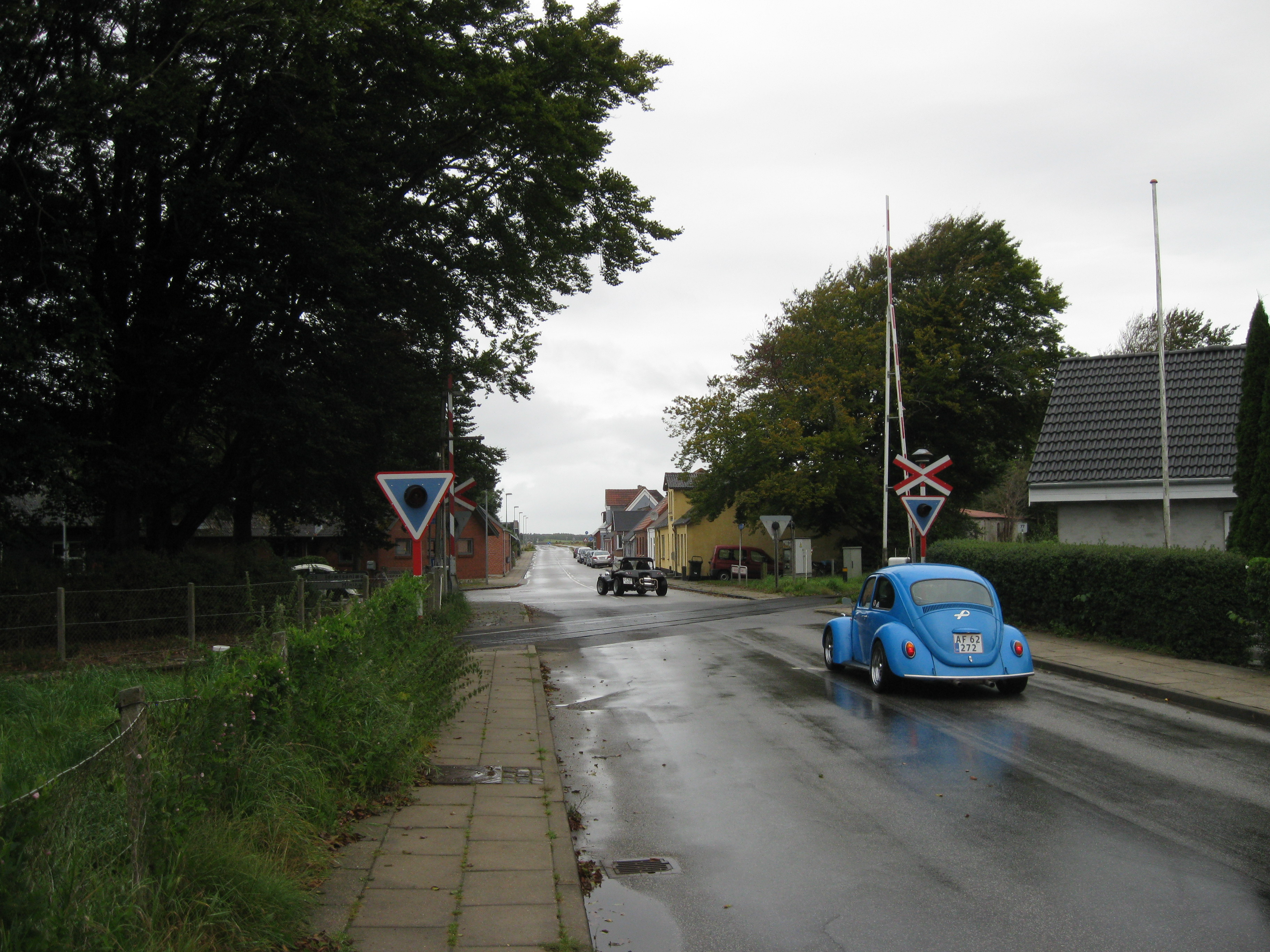
- Snejbjergvej in Studsgård

- Location in Central Denmark Region Studsgaard (Denmark)
- Coordinates: 56°5′22″N 8°54′26″E
- Country: Denmark
- Region: Central Denmark Region
- Municipality: Herning Municipality

Population (2026)
  - Total: 450

Studsgård is a small railway town in Herning Municipality in central Jutland, Denmark. It is located 8 kilometres (5.0 mi) southwest of Herning. As of 1 January 2026, Studsgård has a population of 450. Studsgård is located at the Skanderborg-Skjern railway line and is served by Studsgård railway station.

== Gallery ==
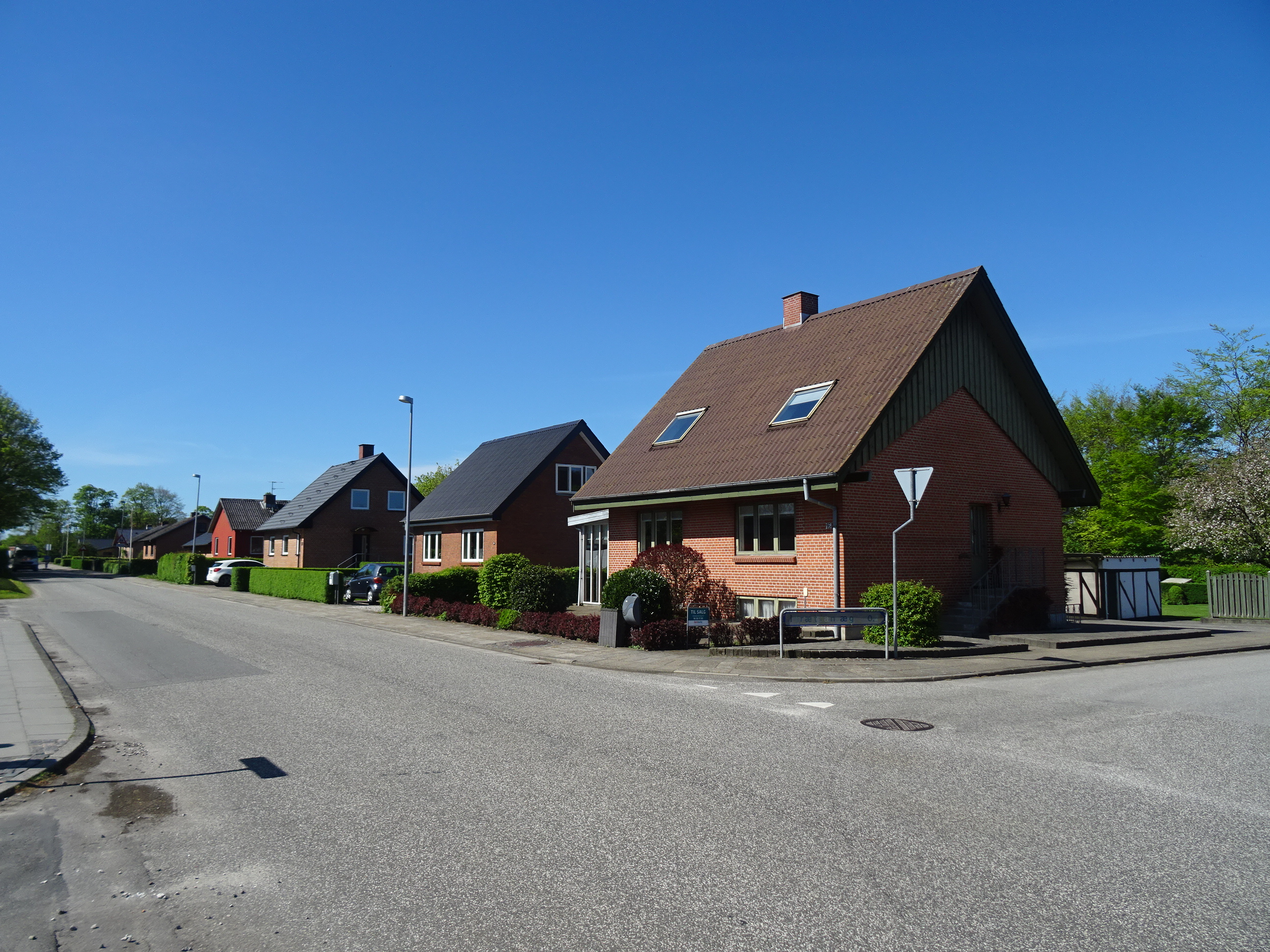
Momhøjvej

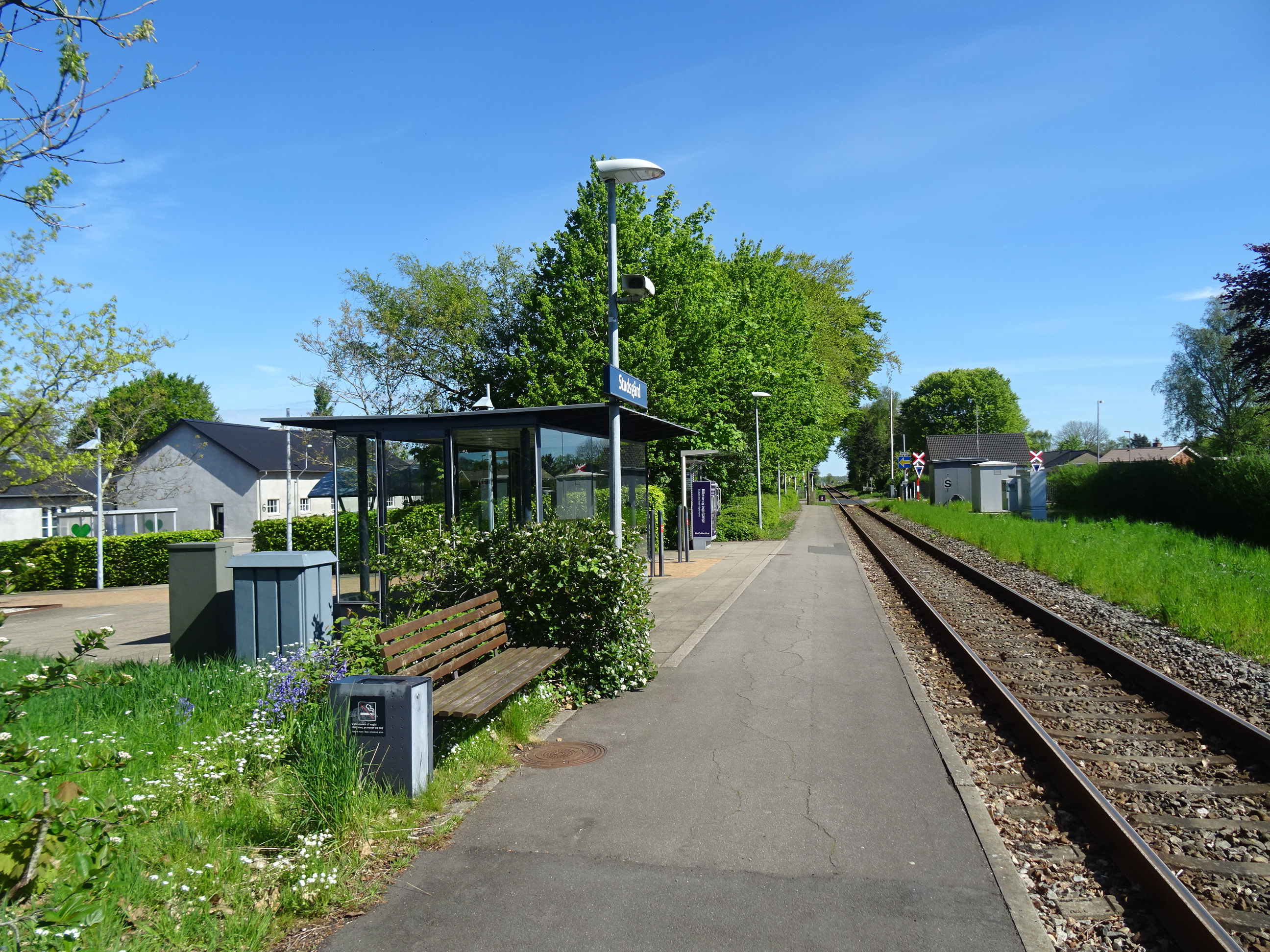
Studsgård railway station

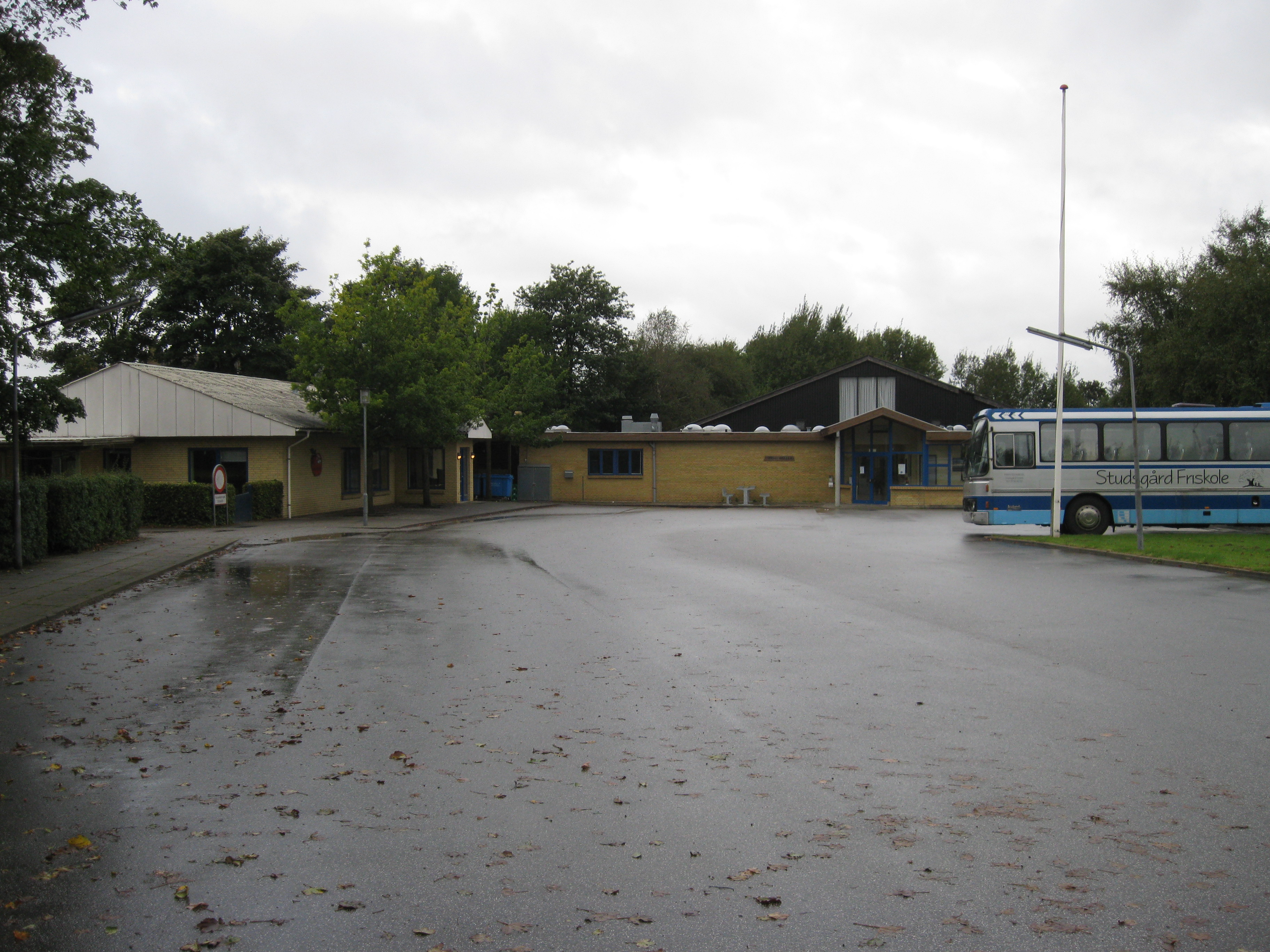
Studsgård Friskole

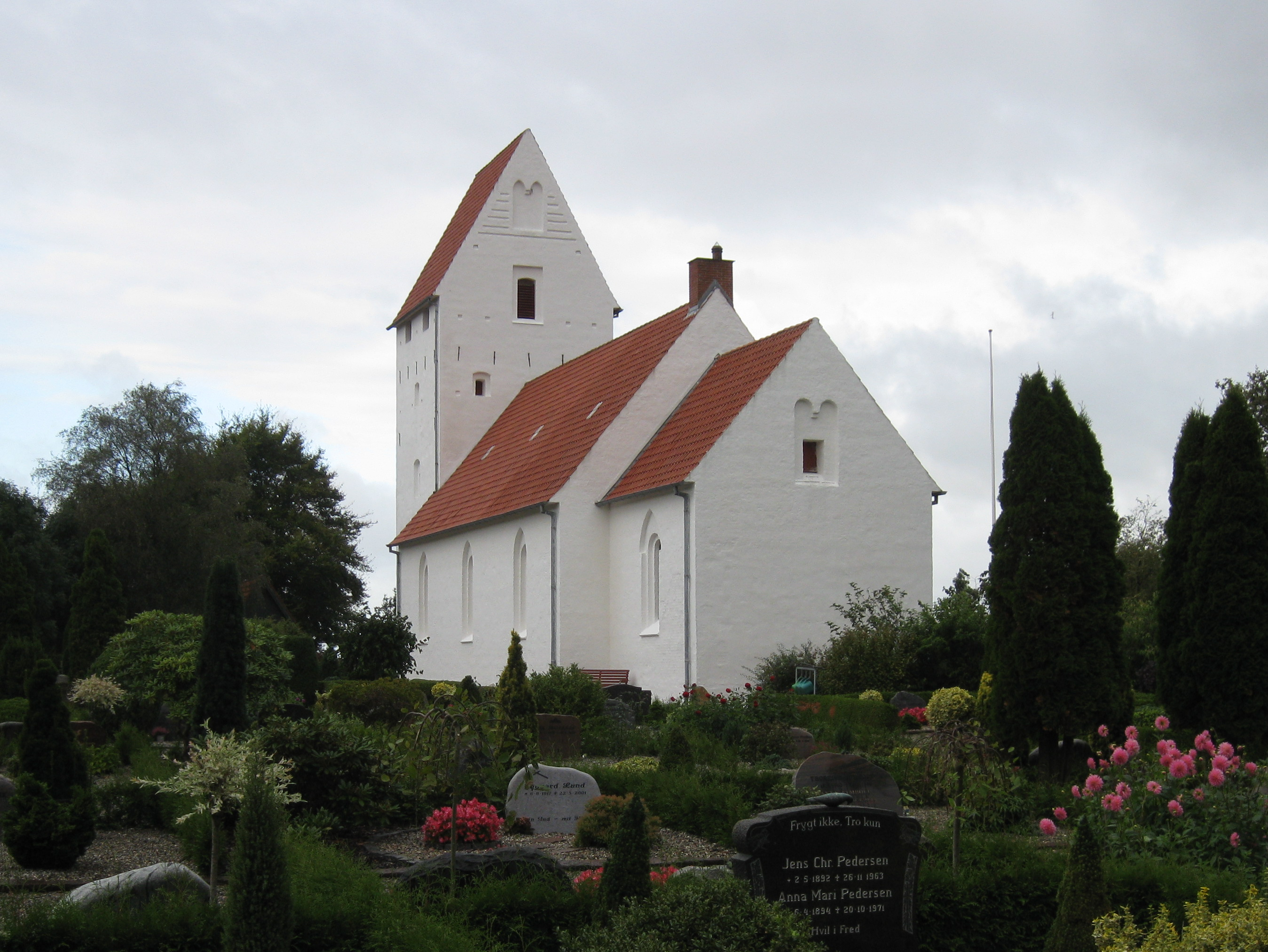
Studsgård Church

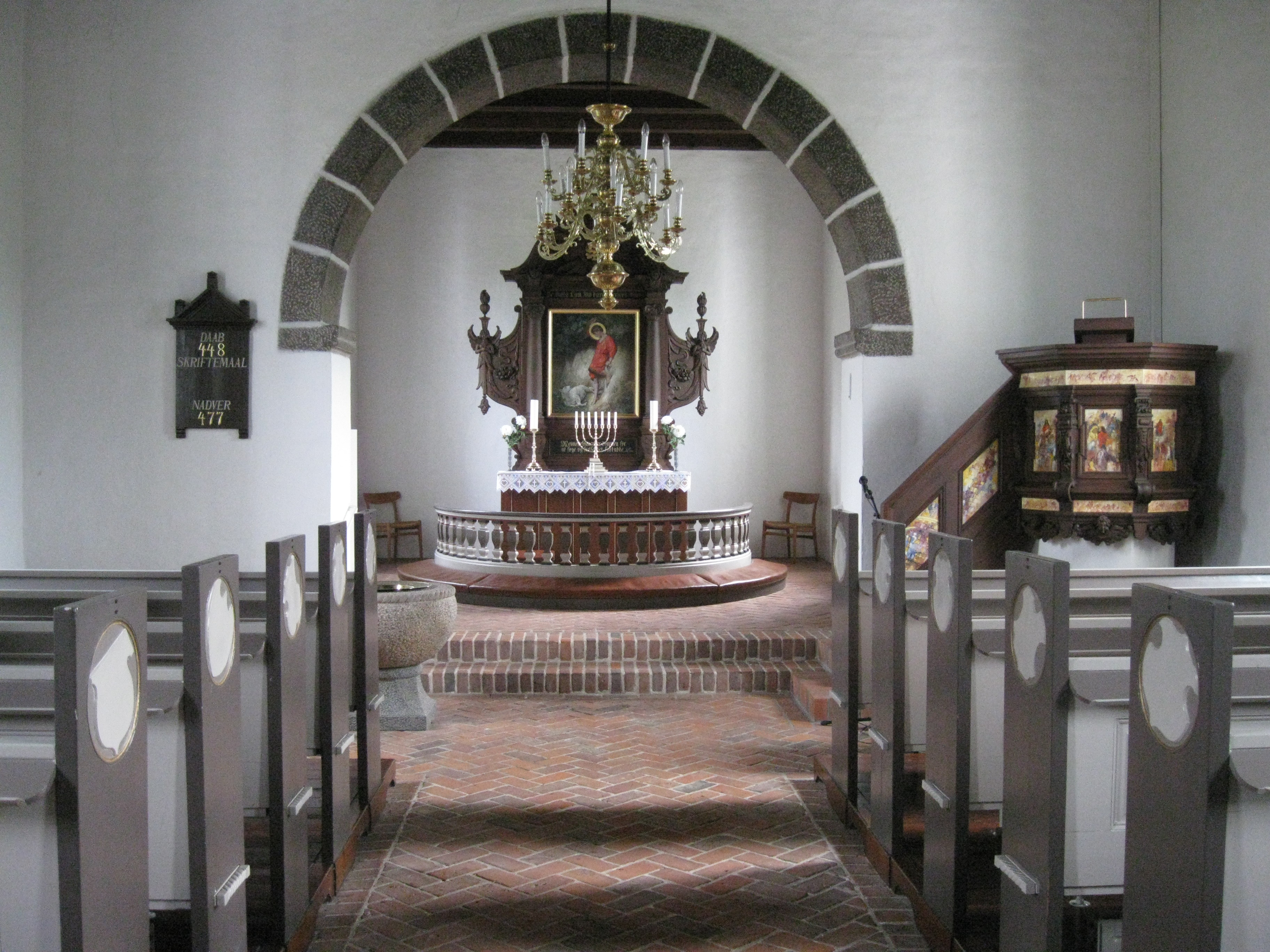
Studsgård Church
