= Peter H. Fogtdal =

Danish novelist and poet

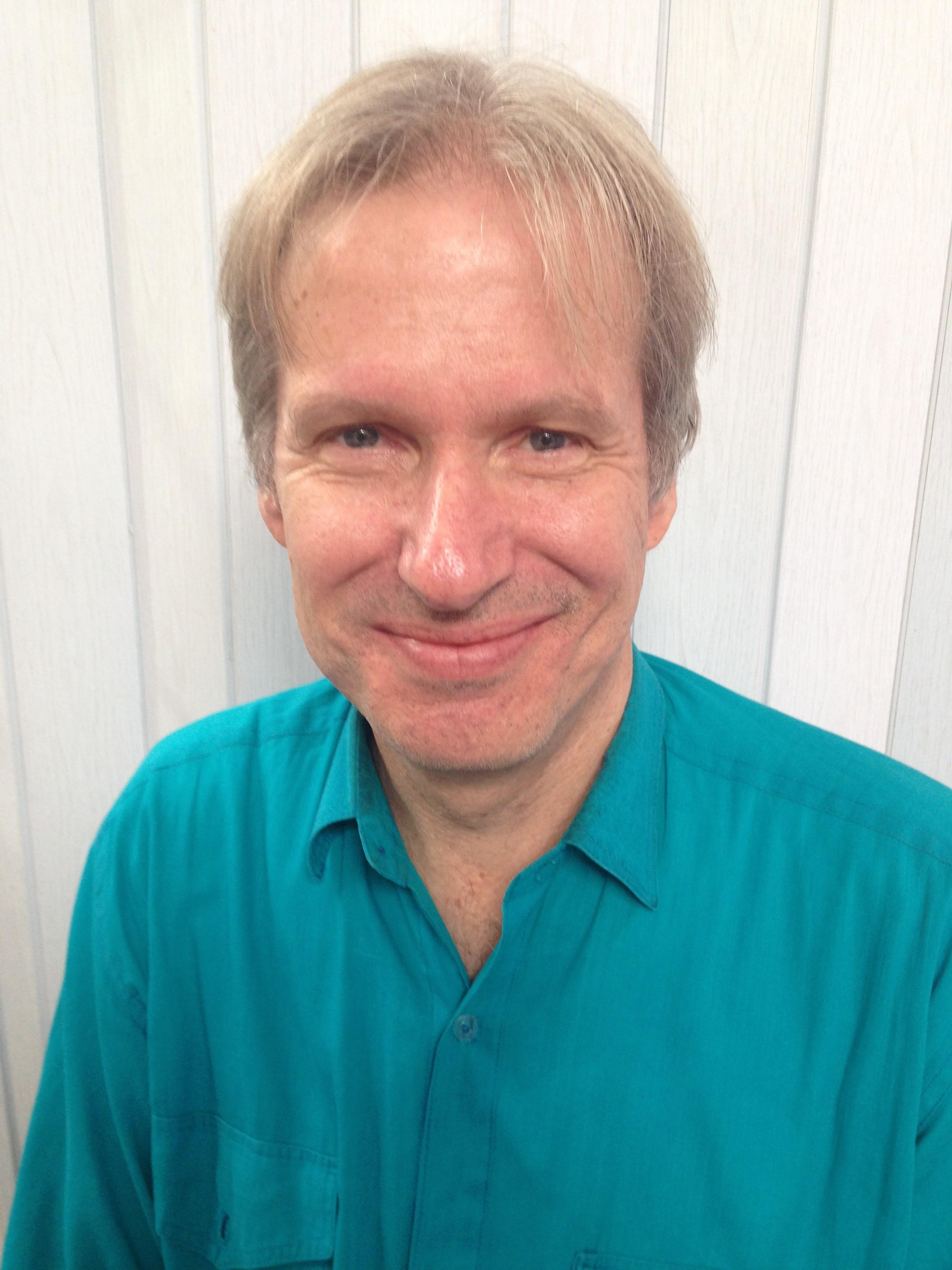
Peter-Fogtdal

Peter H. Fogtdal (born 22 May 1956) is a Danish novelist and poet. He has written 14 novels in Danish. Three have been translated into French, two into Portuguese, and one into English, Serbian, and Ukrainian. In Denmark he is known for writing novels with a spiritual, mystical or humorous slant.

In 2005 he won a French literary prize, Prix Littéraire des Ambassadeurs de la Francophonie for his translated novel Le front chantilly (Floedeskumsfronten). In 2001 this novel was named one of the three best novels of the year by the biggest Danish newspaper Jyllands-Posten.

Peter H. Fogtdal lives in Portland, Oregon but goes back to Copenhagen, Denmark often.

Novels in English:

- The Tsar's Dwarf (2008, [Hawthorne Books] (ISBN 0-9790188-0-3)
- The Mango Dancer (2022)

Selected novels in Danish:

- Drømmeren fra Palæstina (1998, {L&R}
- Flødeskumsfronten (2001, {L&R}
- Zarens dværg (2006, {L&R}
- Skorpionens hale (2008, {Gyldendal}
- Det egyptiske hjerte (2015, {PeoplesPress}
- Det store glidefald (2017, {Turbine}
- Klokketårnet i Piacenza

Poetry collection:

- - My Crimes of Gelato: Second Edition (2021)
