= Kibæk =

Town in Denmark

- Town
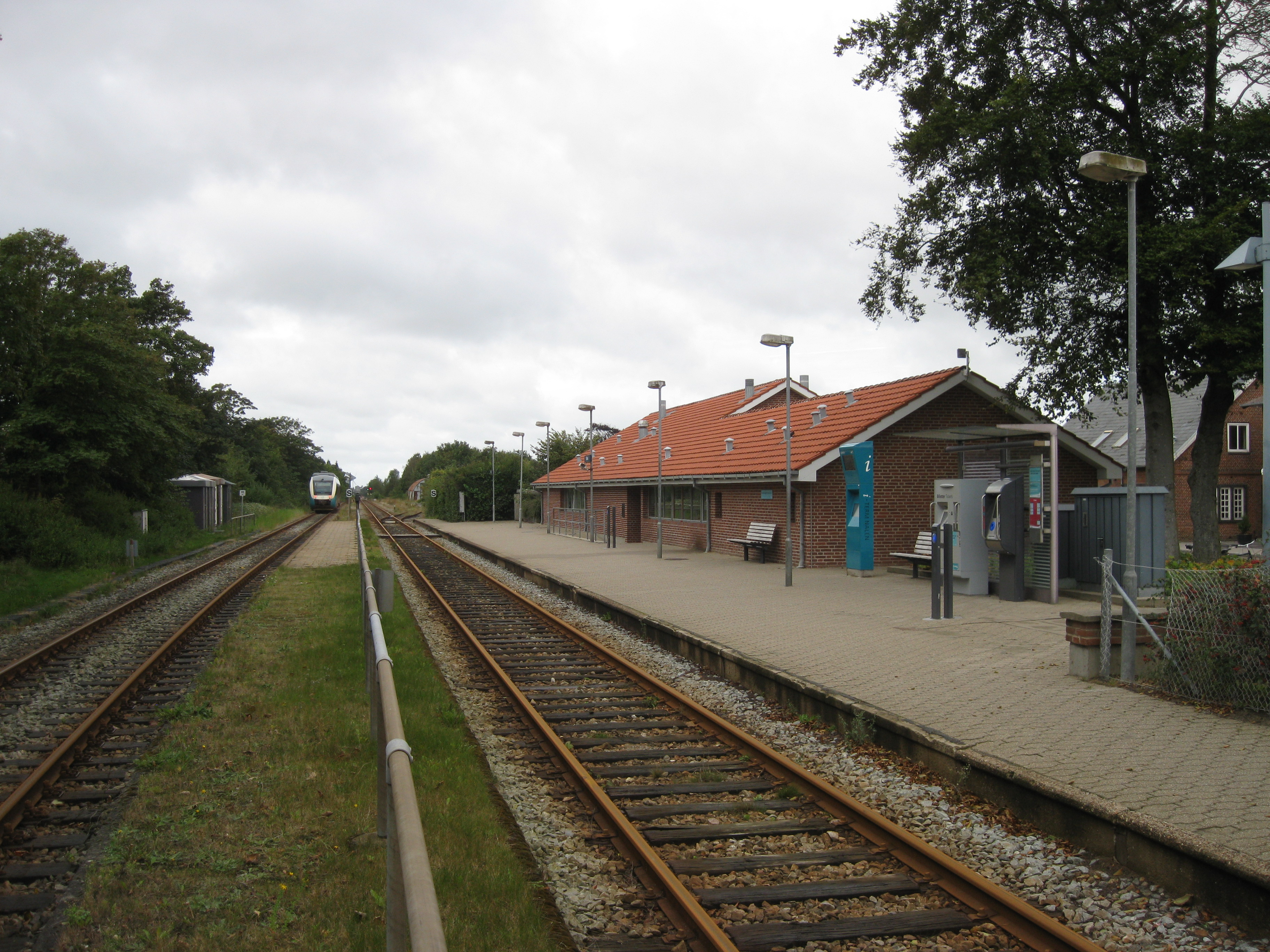
- Kibæk railway station

- Location in Denmark Kibæk (Central Denmark Region)
- Coordinates: 56°2′0″N 8°51′20″E
- Country: Denmark
- Region: Central Denmark
- Municipality: Herning Municipality

Area
  - Urban: 2.22 km^{2} (0.86 sq mi)

Population (2026)
  - Urban: 2,640
  - Urban density: 1,190/km^{2} (3,080/sq mi)
- Time zone: UTC+1 (CET)
  - Summer (DST): UTC+2 (CEST)
- Postal code: DK-6933 Kibæk

Kibæk is a town in Herning Municipality in Denmark with a population of 2,640 (1 January 2026). It was founded because of the railroad. This small provincial town consists of two streets with shops, and it is surrounded by moors, forests and streams. Nearest major town is Herning. Kibæk was the administrative center in Aaskov Municipality between 1970 and 2006.

== Etymology ==
The oldest known source for the name Kibæk is from 1466, where the form Kybeck appears. Later evidence includes forms such as Kibeck (1638) and Kibek (1797). The meaning of the first part is disputed, but it is possibly an Old Danish noun kwī, which means 'cattle fold'. However, it could also represent a well-known, old coincidence between words of twi- and kwi-, which refer to something twofold. The second part of the name (bæk) means stream. The name may thus mean either "the stream by the cattle fold" or "the two-part stream".

== History ==
The stream, which runs through Kibæk, created the basis for a watermill established sometime in the early 1400s, which until the end of the 19th century was the most important building in the area. With the construction of the railway between Herning and Skjern in 1881, Kibæk became home to a station, which created the basis for a large population growth in the following decades. Thus, at the 1901 census, 248 inhabitants were registered, and the town now had three merchants, a manufactory, an innkeeper, a lumber merchant, a physician, and a number of artisans. However, Kibæk also still had a number of farmers and homesteaders. There were also mission houses from 1889 and assembly houses from 1894. In the 1910s, the town also got a school, power station and pharmacy.

Kibæk continued its growth in the following decades. There were 479 inhabitants in 1925, 720 in 1955 and 1,279 in 1970. This development meant that Kibæk, which until the end of the 19th century had only been a secondary settlement in Assing Sogn, accommodated more than half of the parish's population. Kibæk also became the home of Assing Sogn's municipal office in 1958. The town received a nursing home in 1929, a library in 1937, a central school in 1958 and a retirement home in 1963. In addition, there were recreational facilities and sports fields. Between the 1920s and 1960s, the business community expanded with i.a. cooperative dairy, cement goods factory and several knitwear and furniture factories.

== Notable people ==
- David Huda (born ca. 1898 in Safed, Palestine - 1982 in Denmark), author, school teacher, member of the Danish resistance during WW II, maternal grandfather of Peter H. Fogtdal.
- Kristian Bach Bak (born 1982 in Kibæk) a retired Danish professional footballer, 332 club caps
- Mai Villadsen (born 1991) political spokesperson for the Red–Green Alliance, grew up in Kibæk and attended Kibæk School
- Niklas Eg (born 1995 in Kibæk) a Danish cyclist
