= Aulum =

- Town
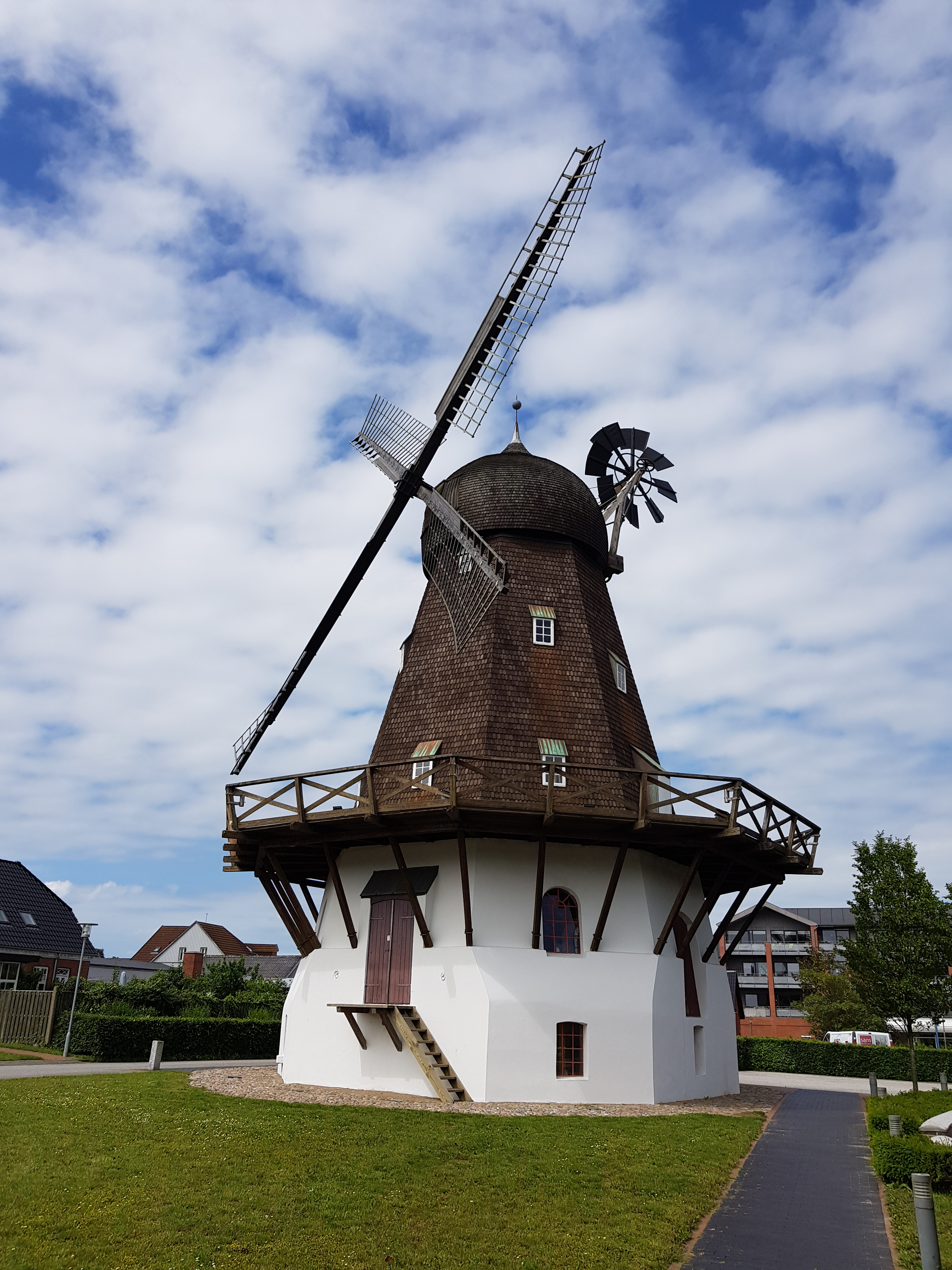
- Aulum windmill

- Location in Denmark Aulum (Central Denmark Region)
- Coordinates: 56°15′58″N 8°47′39″E
- Country: Denmark
- Region: Region Midtjylland
- Municipality: Herning Municipality

Area
  - Urban: 2.7 km^{2} (1.0 sq mi)

Population (2026)
  - Urban: 3,232
  - Urban density: 1,200/km^{2} (3,100/sq mi)
  - Gender: 1,630 males and 1,602 females
- Time zone: UTC+1 (CET)
  - Summer (DST): UTC+2 (CEST)
- Postal code: DK-7490 Aulum

Aulum or Avlum is a railway town situated between Holstebro and Herning in Region Midtjylland, with a population of 3,232 (1 January 2026). It was the main town and the municipal seat of the now abolished Aulum-Haderup Municipality.

== Transportation ==
Aulum is located at the Vejle–Holstebro railway line and is served by Aulum railway station.
