= Feldborg =

- Village
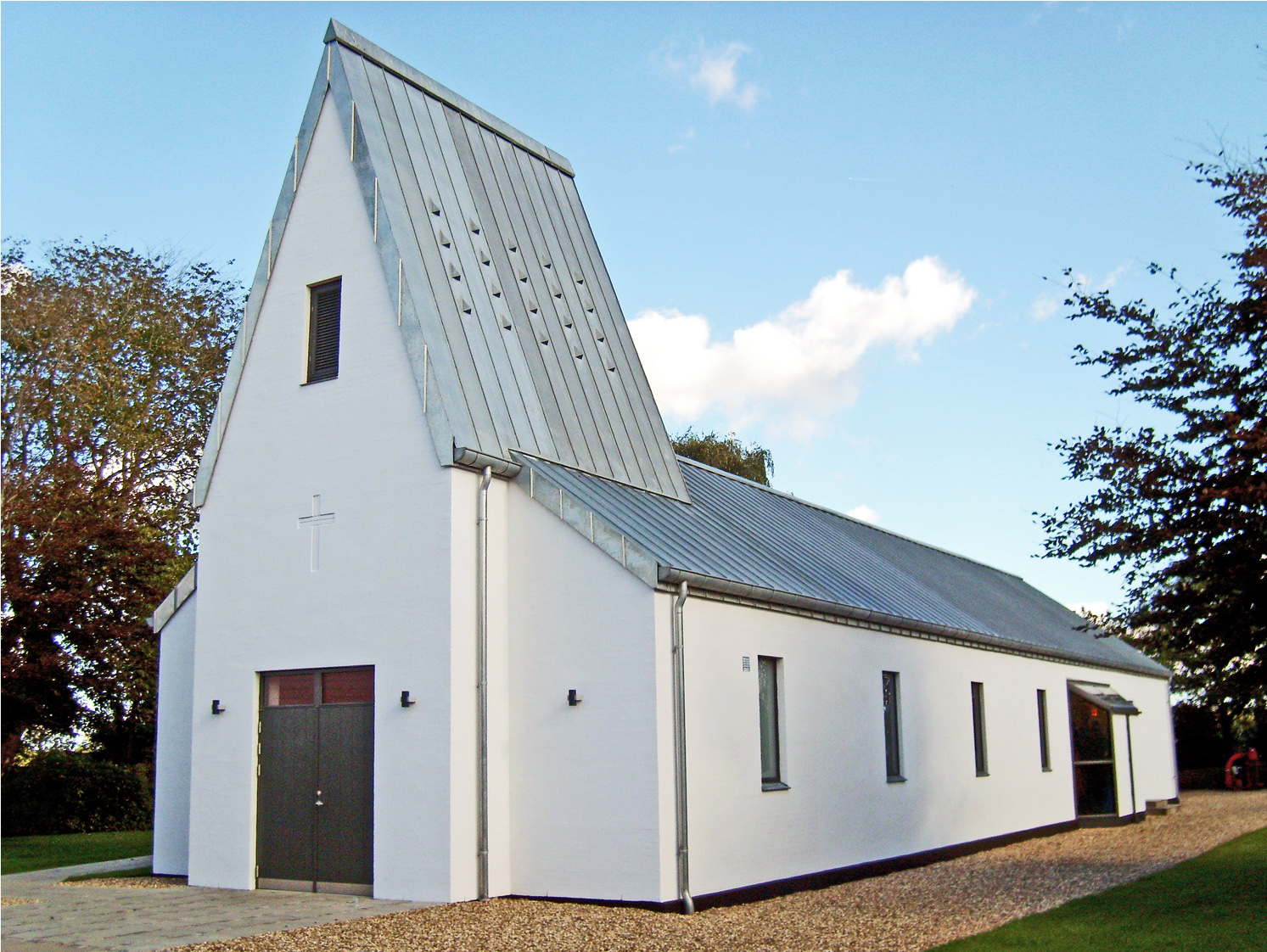
- Feldborg Church

- Location in Central Denmark Region Feldborg (Denmark)
- Coordinates: 56°20′9″N 8°56′7″E
- Country: Denmark
- Region: Central Denmark (Midtjylland)
- Municipality: Herning Municipality

Population (2026)
  - Total: 511

Feldborg is a village, with a population of 511 (1 January 2026), in Herning Municipality, Central Denmark Region in Denmark. It is located 25 km east of Holstebro and 27 km north of Herning.

Feldborg Church is located in the village.
