= Trehøje Municipality =

Former municipality in Denmark

Trehøje was a municipality (Danish, kommune) in Ringkjøbing County on the Jutland peninsula in west Denmark. The municipality covered an area of 296 km^{2}, and had a total population of 9,929 (2005). Its mayor was Svend Blæsbjerg, a member of the Venstre (Liberal Party) political party.

The main town and the site of its municipal council was the town of Vildbjerg.

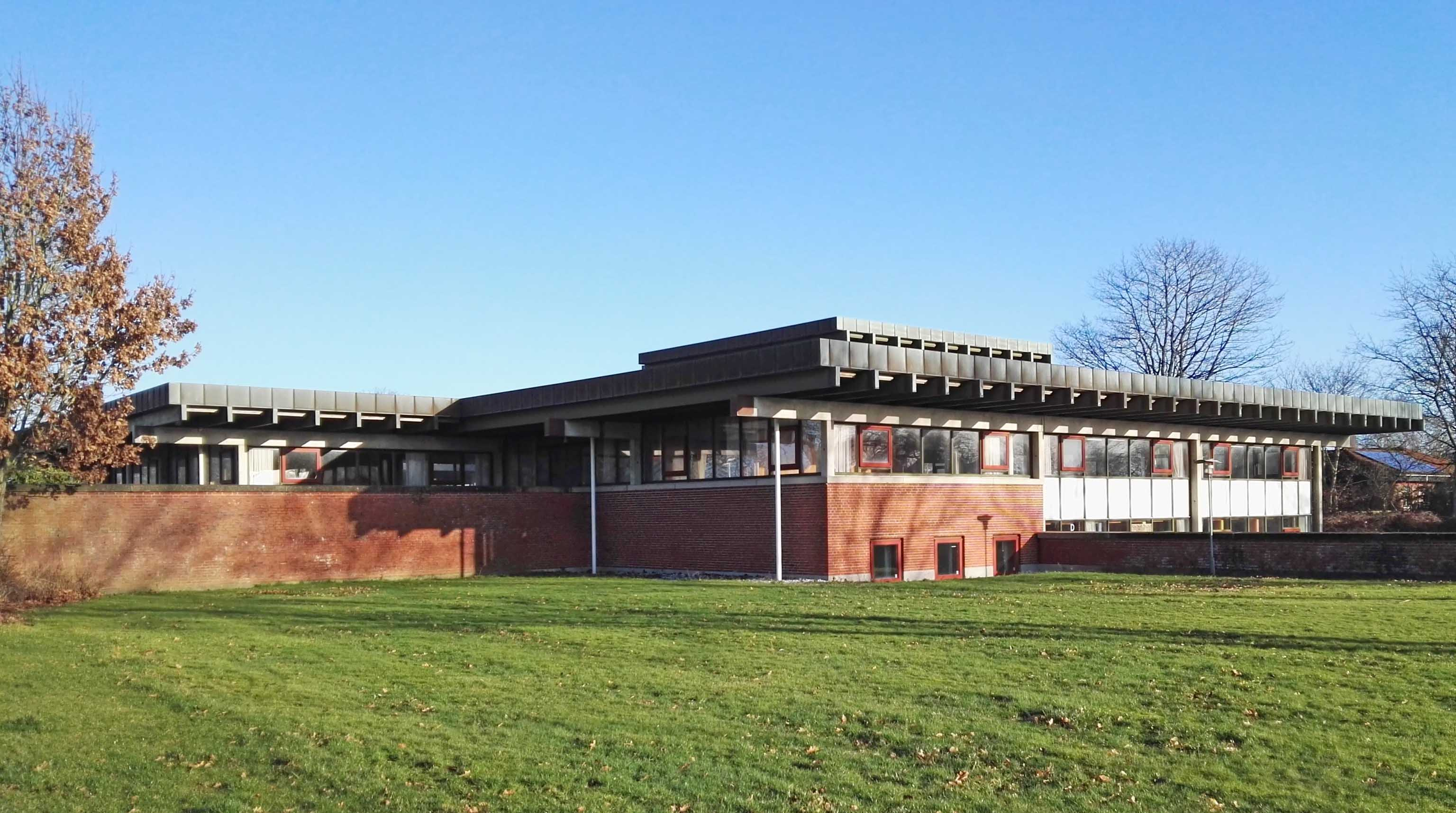
The former townhall of Trehøje Municipality in Vildbjerg

Neighboring municipalities were Herning and Aulum-Haderup to the east, Holstebro to the north, Ulfborg-Vemb and Ringkøbing to the west, and Videbæk to the south.

By January 1, 2007, Trehøje municipality ceased to exist, as the result of Kommunalreformen ("The Municipality Reform" of 2007). It merged with the existing Aulum-Haderup, Herning, and Aaskov municipalities to form the new Herning municipality. This created a municipality with an area of 1,336 km^{2} and a total population of 82,935 (2005). The new municipality belongs to the new Region Midtjylland ("Mid-Jutland Region").
