= Herning Municipality =

Herning Municipality Herning Kommune (Danish)
- Municipality
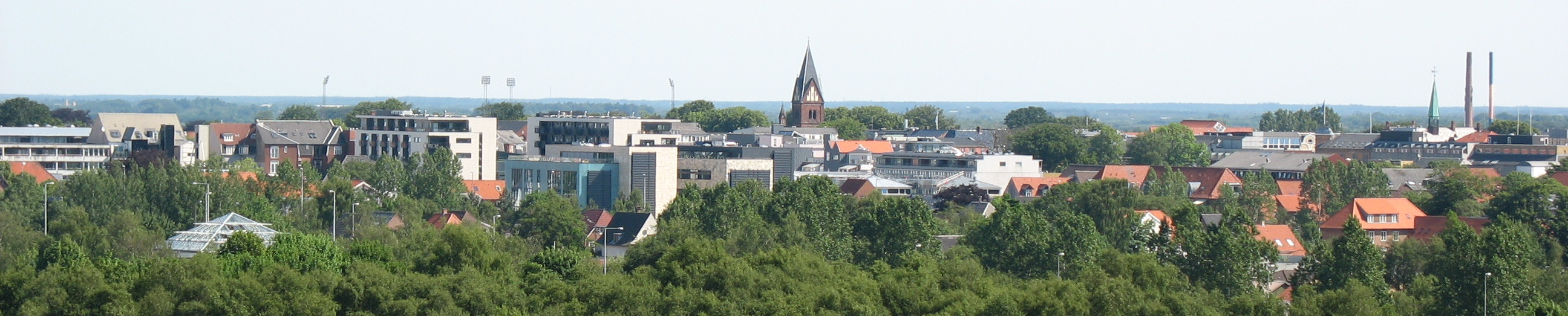

- Flag Coat of arms

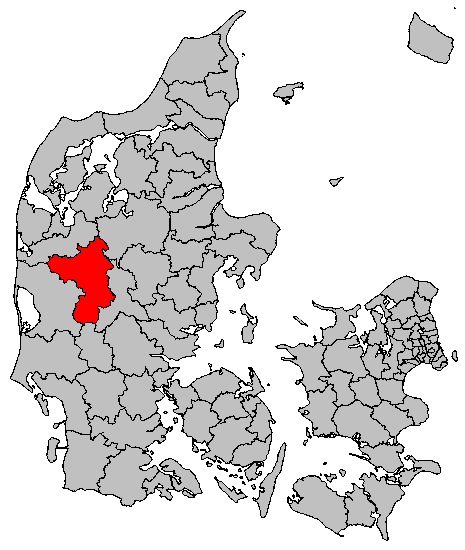
- Coordinates: 56°08′00″N 8°59′00″E
- Country: Denmark
- Region: Central Denmark
- Seat: Herning

Government
  - Mayor: Dorte West

Area
  - Total: 1,322.87 km^{2} (510.76 sq mi)

Population (1 January 2026)
  - Total: 90,546
  - Density: 68.447/km^{2} (177.28/sq mi)
- Time zone: UTC1 (CET)
  - Summer (DST): UTC2 (CEST)
- Postal code: 7400
- Website: www.herning.dk

Herning Municipality (Danish: Herning Kommune) is a municipality (Danish, kommune) in Region Midtjylland on the Jutland peninsula in western Denmark. The municipality covers an area of 1,322.87 km^{2} (510.76 sq mi) and has a population of 90,546 (1 January 2026). Its mayor is Dorte West, a member of the Venstre (Liberal Party) political party.

The main town and the site of its municipal council is the Town of Herning.

== History ==
On 1 January 2007, as the result of Kommunalreformen ("The Municipal Reform" of 2007), Herning municipality was merged with former Aulum-Haderup, Trehøje, and Aaskov municipalities to form the new Herning municipality.

== Locations ==
Herning	50,531
Sunds	4,235
Vildbjerg	4,017
Aulum	3,273
Kibæk	2,699
Gullestrup	2,008
Sønder Felding	1,436
Sørvad	1,117

=== The city of Herning ===
The city of Herning has a population of 51,193 (1 January 2023). The town has grown rapidly in the 150 years: in 1840 the total population of the village of Herning was just 21.

== Politics ==
=== Municipal council ===
Herning's municipal council consists of 31 members, elected every four years.

Below are the municipal councils elected since the Municipal Reform of 2007.

Election	Party											Total seats	Turnout	Elected mayor
Election	A	B	C	F	H	I	K	O	V	Æ	Ø	Total seats	Turnout	Elected mayor
2005	5	2	1	1			2	1	19			31	73.7%	Lars Krarup (V)
2009	4	1	1	3			1	1	20			31	71.1%	Lars Krarup (V)
2013	4	2		1			1	3	19		1	31	75.3%	Lars Krarup (V)
2017	5	1	2	1			1	1	19		1	31	74.2%	Lars Krarup (V)
2021	4	2	2	2	2		1	1	17			31	68.8%	Dorte West (V)
2025	3	2	2	3	1	1	1	1	15	2		31	69.5%	Dorte West (V)
Data from Kmdvalg.dk 2005, 2009, 2013, 2017 and 2021. Data from valg.dk 2025

== Notable people ==
- Gudmund Hatt (1884–1960), archaeologist and cultural geographer

== Twin towns – sister cities ==
Herning is twinned with:

- Arsuk, Greenland
- Countryside, Åland Islands, Finland
- Eiði, Faroe Islands
- Holmestrand, Norway
- Husby, Germany
- Kangasala, Finland
- Siglufjörður, Iceland
- Vänersborg, Sweden

== See also ==
- Sinddinggaard
