= 2021 Ringkøbing-Skjern municipal election =

← 2017	16 November 2021	2025 →

All 29 seats to the Ringkøbing-Skjern Municipal Council 15 seats needed for a majority
- Turnout: 31,071 (70.1%) ▼4.7pp
	First party	Second party	Third party
	V	K	A
Party	Venstre	Christian Democrats	Social Democrats
Last election	11 seats, 36.9%	6 seats, 15.5%	6 seats, 21.3%
Seats won	11	6	4
Seat change	0	0	▼2
Popular vote	10,400	5,960	4,581
Percentage	34.0%	19.5%	15.0%
Swing	▼2.9%	▲4.0%	▼6.3%
	Fourth party	Fifth party	Sixth party
	C	F	D
Party	Conservatives	Green Left	New Right
Last election	0 seats, 1.7%	3 seats, 9.5%	Did not stand
Seats won	3	3	1
Seat change	▲3	0	▲1
Popular vote	3,043	2,960	1,188
Percentage	9.9%	9.7%	3.9%
Swing	▲8.2%	▲0.2%	New
	Seventh party	Eighth party
	O	J
Party	Danish People's Party	Fjordlisten
Last election	2 seats, 6.7%	1 seat, 3.2%
Seats won	1	0
Seat change	▼1	▼1
Popular vote	1,165	538
Percentage	3.8%	1.8%
Swing	▼2.9%	▼1.4%
Mayor before election
Hans Østergaard
Venstre
Mayor after election
Hans Østergaard
Venstre

Since the 2007 municipal reform, Ringkøbing-Skjern municipality has been a strong area for centre-right Venstre. However, in 2017, Venstre won only 11 seats, 3 less than they did in 2013. This meant they were 4 seats short of a majority. The Christian Democrats who won 6 seats, and became the joint 2nd biggest party, were looking to get their first mayor in a Danish municipality. However, in a surprising turn of events, the Social Democrats ended up supporting Hans Østergaard from Venstre instead, citing multiple reasons, such as the Christian Democrats being a small party nationwide, and that Kristian Andersen, who was the candidate of the Christian Democrats, did not support gay marriage.

Due to the dramatic outcome the year before, and that Christian Democrats were doing relatively well at the opinion polls nationwide before the election, there were some speculation to whether the Christian Democrats could once again challenge Venstre in getting the mayor's office. However, despite the Christian Democrats increasing their vote share, and Venstre decreasing their vote share, both parties kept the same number of seats, and it was later announced that Hans Østergaard would continue for a 2nd term.

== Electoral system ==
For elections to Danish municipalities, a number varying from 9 to 31 are chosen to be elected to the municipal council. The seats are then allocated using the D'Hondt method and a closed list proportional representation. Ringkøbing-Skjern Municipality had 29 seats in 2021

Unlike in Danish General Elections, in elections to municipal councils, electoral alliances are allowed.

== Electoral alliances ==
=== Electoral Alliance 1 ===
Party		Political alignment
F	Green Left	Centre-left to Left-wing
J	Fjordlisten	Local politics

=== Electoral Alliance 2 ===
Party		Political alignment
C	Conservatives	Centre-right
I	Liberal Alliance	Centre-right to Right-wing
O	Danish People's Party	Right-wing to Far-right

=== Electoral Alliance 3 ===
Party		Political alignment
B	Social Liberals	Centre to Centre-left
Ø	Red–Green Alliance	Left-wing to Far-Left

== Results by polling station ==
Division	A	B	C	D	F	I	J	K	O	V	Ø
Division	%	%	%	%	%	%	%	%	%	%	%
Tarm	12.8	0.6	6.9	3.1	14.1	1.0	5.4	30.4	3.4	21.6	0.8
Holmsland	10.4	1.7	15.0	6.8	9.9	0.5	0.5	14.0	3.8	36.8	0.5
Hoven	11.9	1.6	9.8	6.1	10.7	2.5	3.3	13.9	6.1	32.8	1.2
Lyne	20.5	0.9	2.3	3.4	7.7	2.3	2.1	15.1	3.8	41.2	0.6
Bork	12.4	1.7	8.6	5.2	8.6	3.1	3.6	18.1	4.5	33.0	1.4
Lønborg	12.7	1.4	8.9	5.1	10.4	1.5	4.4	24.4	5.4	24.5	1.2
Hvide Sande	8.9	0.5	13.1	3.2	4.4	0.8	1.0	32.9	3.1	31.4	0.7
Velling	12.5	1.2	12.6	3.2	20.7	0.6	1.2	14.4	3.2	28.2	2.2
Ølstrup	11.0	0.7	8.6	4.8	7.3	0.4	1.8	11.5	4.0	48.0	2.0
Ringkøbing	15.4	0.9	19.8	3.1	17.5	0.7	0.9	13.3	2.6	24.5	1.2
Hee	10.3	1.1	15.1	5.8	10.7	0.5	1.2	9.2	11.1	33.5	1.3
Stadil	10.5	0.9	7.4	2.9	8.5	1.6	0.9	6.0	2.2	57.4	1.8
Højmark	11.3	1.2	6.1	4.5	9.2	1.2	2.4	12.7	2.6	48.3	0.5
Lem	14.6	0.7	7.7	4.4	12.0	0.1	1.6	11.3	3.9	43.4	0.3
Tim	12.3	1.8	9.3	4.6	14.8	1.1	1.0	7.0	4.7	43.1	0.4
Skjern	19.9	1.0	7.5	3.0	6.9	1.0	1.4	23.2	3.5	32.0	0.7
Borris	11.7	0.4	4.1	3.3	4.6	0.4	0.7	9.0	2.8	62.3	0.8
Faster	7.1	0.2	3.8	7.1	4.7	0.4	1.7	28.2	2.1	44.2	0.4
Rækker Mølle	10.4	1.4	6.8	4.8	4.9	1.6	1.1	33.2	2.3	32.5	0.9
Stauning	12.0	2.1	6.2	5.6	10.5	1.0	2.1	16.5	18.8	24.2	1.0
Nr.Vium	12.8	1.2	7.1	4.2	2.4	0.6	0.0	19.3	5.4	46.1	0.9
Videbæk	19.1	0.2	6.3	3.9	4.9	0.2	2.5	27.2	2.5	32.5	0.7
Troldhede	13.9	0.6	4.7	5.0	4.1	0.3	1.8	13.3	6.2	47.6	2.4
Vorgod-Barde	16.8	0.6	5.0	3.7	2.2	0.4	1.1	16.8	3.5	49.3	0.7
Spjald	19.6	0.6	5.3	5.1	4.4	0.5	0.8	13.0	2.9	47.1	0.7

== Results ==
Party		Votes	%	+/-	Seats	+/-
Ringkøbing-Skjern Municipality
V	Venstre	10,402	33.95	-2.93	11	0
K	Christian Democrats	5,960	19.45	+3.98	6	0
A	Social Democrats	4,581	14.95	-6.34	4	-2
C	Conservatives	3,043	9.93	+8.20	3	+3
F	Green Left	2,961	9.67	+0.16	3	0
D	New Right	1,188	3.88	New	1	New
O	Danish People's Party	1,164	3.80	-2.92	1	-1
J	Fjordlisten	538	1.76	-1.49	0	-1
Ø	Red-Green Alliance	281	0.92	-0.30	0	0
B	Social Liberals	267	0.87	-0.17	0	0
I	Liberal Alliance	250	0.82	-1.69	0	0
Total		30,635	100	N/A	29	N/A
Invalid votes		132	0.30	+0.22		
Blank votes		304	0.69	+0.07		
Turnout		31,071	70.11	-4.69		
Source: valg.dk
