= 2025 Ringkøbing-Skjern municipal election =

Municipal election in Denmark

← 2021	18 November 2025	2029 →

All 29 seats to the Ringkøbing-Skjern municipal council 15 seats needed for a majority
- Turnout: 31,735 (72.2%) ▲2.1%
	First party	Second party	Third party
	V	Æ	K
Party	Venstre	Denmark Democrats	Christian Democrats
Last election	11 seats, 34.0%	Did not stand	6 seats, 19.5%
Seats won	8	7	5
Seat change	▼3	▲7	▼1
Popular vote	8,310	6,786	5,598
Percentage	26.5%	21.7%	17.9%
Swing	▼7.4%	New	▼1.6%
	Fourth party	Fifth party	Sixth party
	A	F	I
Party	Social Democrats	Green Left	Liberal Alliance
Last election	4 seats, 15.0%	3 seats, 9.7%	0 seats, 0.8%
Seats won	3	3	1
Seat change	▼1	0	▲1
Popular vote	3,291	2,874	1,240
Percentage	10.5%	9.2%	4.0%
Swing	▼4.4%	▼0.5%	▲3.1%
	Seventh party	Eighth party	Ninth party
	C	O	D
Party	Conservatives	Danish People's Party	New Right
Last election	3 seats, 9.9%	1 seat, 3.8%	1 seat, 3.9%
Seats won	1	1	0
Seat change	▼2	0	▼1
Popular vote	1,236	734	136
Percentage	3.9%	2.3%	0.4%
Swing	▼6.0%	▼1.5%	▼3.4%
Mayor before election
Hans Østergaard
Venstre
Mayor after election
Lennart Qvist
Conservatives

The 2025 Ringkøbing-Skjern Municipal election will be held on November 18, 2025, to elect the 29 members to sit in the regional council for the Ringkøbing-Skjern Municipal council, in the period of 2026 to 2029. The election saw a significant result for the Denmark Democrats. Mads Fuglede sought the mayoral position, and looked successful, initially securing the first mayoral position for the party in history. However, Green Left dropped out of the deal, and eventually the Conservatives, who won the mayoral position on a deal between Venstre, the Social Democrats, Green Left and the Conservatives. This would see Lennart Qvist, the only elected politician from the Conservatives in the election, become the next mayor.

== Background ==
Following the 2021 election, Hans Østergaard from Venstre became mayor for his second term. However, he announced in August 2024, that we he would not seek a third term. Instead, Lone Andersen would be the mayoral candidate from Venstre.

== Electoral system ==
For elections to Danish municipalities, a number varying from 9 to 31 are chosen to be elected to the municipal council. The seats are then allocated using the D'Hondt method and a closed list proportional representation. Ringkøbing-Skjern Municipality had 29 seats in 2025.

== Electoral alliances ==
=== Electoral Alliance 1 ===
Party		Political alignment
A	Social Democrats	Centre-left
V	Venstre	Centre-right

=== Electoral Alliance 2 ===
Party		Political alignment
C	Conservatives	Centre-right
D	New Right	Far-right
I	Liberal Alliance	Centre-right to Right-wing
O	Danish People's Party	Right-wing to Far-right

=== Electoral Alliance 3 ===
Party		Political alignment
F	Green Left	Centre-left to Left-wing
Ø	Red-Green Alliance	Left-wing to Far-Left

=== Electoral Alliance 4 ===
Party		Political alignment
K	Christian Democrats	Centre to Centre-right
Æ	Denmark Democrats	Right-wing to Far-right

== Results by polling station ==
Division	A	C	D	F	I	J	K	O	V	Æ	Ø
Division	%	%	%	%	%	%	%	%	%	%	%
Tarm	9.7	2.3	0.2	16.9	3.5	2.7	24.5	3.0	19.0	17.4	0.7
Holmsland	8.7	6.9	0.3	9.4	5.9	2.9	11.1	2.4	26.6	25.1	0.9
Ådum	5.2	1.6	0.4	7.1	3.9	8.2	12.6	3.9	21.2	35.2	0.7
Hemmet	4.8	0.5	1.5	7.0	4.5	6.2	11.4	3.6	23.2	36.4	1.0
Hvide Sande	5.1	3.8	0.3	5.0	4.3	1.0	35.9	2.7	27.1	14.5	0.3
Velling	10.9	5.7	0.2	17.8	2.8	3.9	11.1	1.3	27.1	18.1	1.2
Ringkøbing (ROFI-Centret)	11.6	10.8	0.4	13.9	3.7	1.9	12.9	2.0	24.0	17.5	1.3
Hee	6.6	9.5	0.8	9.4	3.7	1.3	9.1	2.0	16.0	41.3	0.4
Lem	11.7	1.8	0.4	7.0	3.9	4.8	7.9	2.4	41.1	18.3	0.7
Tim	8.4	4.0	0.4	9.8	3.8	0.9	9.1	3.3	25.5	33.9	0.9
Skjern	13.4	2.2	0.4	8.0	4.8	2.4	22.4	1.8	26.4	17.7	0.6
Borris	6.3	1.4	0.4	5.0	2.9	2.9	10.1	1.7	52.3	16.8	0.3
Rækker Mølle	4.6	1.1	0.6	5.1	5.0	2.5	25.6	2.6	30.1	22.5	0.4
Stauning	9.4	1.3	1.0	7.9	4.0	19.8	12.5	1.8	18.8	23.0	0.4
Videbæk	16.5	1.5	0.2	4.8	3.2	2.4	24.4	1.6	25.9	19.1	0.4
Troldhede	9.3	1.1	0.6	5.3	5.5	1.3	14.0	4.8	29.6	28.1	0.3
Vorgod-Barde	12.8	0.9	0.4	2.7	2.6	1.6	18.3	3.2	36.9	19.4	1.0
Spjald	10.0	1.7	0.6	6.8	4.0	1.3	12.6	2.3	27.4	32.7	0.6

== Results ==
Party		Votes	%	+/-	Seats	+/-
Ringkøbing-Skjern Municipality
V	Venstre	8,310	26.53	-7.42	8	-3
Æ	Denmark Democrats	6,786	21.67	New	7	New
K	Christian Democrats	5,598	17.87	-1.58	5	-1
A	Social Democrats	3,291	10.51	-4.45	3	-1
F	Green Left	2,874	9.18	-0.49	3	0
I	Liberal Alliance	1,240	3.96	+3.14	1	+1
C	Conservatives	1,236	3.95	-5.99	1	-2
J	Borgerlisten	879	2.81	New	0	New
O	Danish People's Party	734	2.34	-1.46	1	0
Ø	Red-Green Alliance	234	0.75	-0.17	0	0
D	New Right	136	0.43	-3.44	0	-1
Total		31,318	100	N/A	29	N/A
Invalid votes		84	0.19	-0.11		
Blank votes		333	0.76	+0.06		
Turnout		31,735	72.19	+2.08		
Source: valg.dk

== Opinion polls ==
Polling firm	Fieldwork date	Sample size	V	K	A	C	F	D	O	Ø	I	J	Æ	Others	Lead
Epinion	4 Sep - 13 Oct 2025	425	27.0	–	14.0	4.2	11.7	–	4.3	1.1	5.8	–	24.2	7.8	2.8
2024 european parliament election	9 Jun 2024		26.6	–	11.9	11.0	9.3	–	6.4	1.4	7.2	–	17.9	–	8.7
2022 general election	1 Nov 2022		25.0	4.2	20.8	6.3	4.6	3.5	1.8	1.3	7.1	–	16.7	–	4.2
2021 regional election	16 Nov 2021		35.4	17.9	19.2	7.8	4.4	4.1	4.4	1.8	1.2	–	–	–	16.2
2021 municipal election	16 Nov 2021		34.0 (11)	19.5 (6)	15.0 (4)	9.9 (3)	9.7 (3)	3.9 (1)	3.8 (1)	0.9 (0)	0.8 (0)	–	–	–	14.5
