= Listed buildings in Ringkøbing-Skjern Municipality =

Historic structures in Denmark

This is a list of listed buildings in Ringkøbing-Skjern Municipality, Denmark.

== The list ==
=== 6893 Hemmet ===
Listing name	Image	Location	Coordinates	Description
Gåsemandens Hus		Galgebjergevej 20, 6893 Hemmet		
Gåsemandens Hus		Galgebjergevej 20, 6893 Hemmet		
Gåsemandens Hus		Galgebjergevej 20, 6893 Hemmet		
Gåsemandens Hus		Galgebjergevej 20, 6893 Hemmet		

=== 6900 Skjern ===
Listing name	Image	Location	Coordinates	Description
Bundsbæk Vandmølle		Bundsbækvej 27, 6900 Skjern		
Stavning Rectory		Stauningvej 56, 6900 Skjern		
Vandtårnet ved Skjern Station		Bredgade 77, 6900 Skjern		

=== 6950 Ringkøbing ===
Listing name	Image	Location	Coordinates	Description
Den gamle Borgmestergård		Torvet 20A, 6950 Ringkøbing		
Den gamle Toldbod		V Strandsbjerg 1, 6950 Ringkøbing		
Havnekontoret		Havnepladsen 2, 6950 Ringkøbing		
Holmsland Klitvej 203		Holmsland Klitvej 203, 6950 Ringkøbing		
Holmsland Klitvej 203		Holmsland Klitvej 203, 6950 Ringkøbing		
Holmsland Klitvej 203		Holmsland Klitvej 203, 6950 Ringkøbing		
Holmsland Klitvej 203		Holmsland Klitvej 203, 6950 Ringkøbing		
Holmsland Klitvej 203		Holmsland Klitvej 203, 6950 Ringkøbing		
Hotel Ringkøbing		Torvet 18, 6950 Ringkøbing		
Hotel Ringkøbing		Torvet 18, 6950 Ringkøbing		
Ringkøbing Station		Nørredige 3A, 6950 Ringkøbing		
Ringkøbing Station		Nørredige 3A, 6950 Ringkøbing		
Ringkøbing Station: Warehouse		Nørredige 7, 6950 Ringkøbing		
Velling Rectory		Velling Kirkeby 1, 6950 Ringkøbing		
Vester Strandgade 33		V Strandgade 33A, 6950 Ringkøbing		
Øster Strandgade 13		Ø Strandgade 13, 6950 Ringkøbing		

=== 6960 Hvide Sande ===
Listing name	Image	Location	Coordinates	Description
Abelines Gård		Sønder Klitvej 87, 6960 Hvide Sande		
Abelines Gård		Sønder Klitvej 87, 6960 Hvide Sande		
Abelines Gård		Sønder Klitvej 87, 6960 Hvide Sande		
Abelines Gård		Sønder Klitvej 87, 6960 Hvide Sande		
Fiskergården, Bjerregård		Sønder Klitvej 250A, 6960 Hvide Sande		
Fiskergården, Bjerregård		Sønder Klitvej 250A, 6960 Hvide Sande		
Fiskergården, Bjerregård		Sønder Klitvej 250A, 6960 Hvide Sande		
Haurvig		Sønder Klitvej 84, 6960 Hvide Sande		
Haurvig		Sønder Klitvej 84, 6960 Hvide Sande		
Haurvig		Sønder Klitvej 84, 6960 Hvide Sande		
Haurvig		Sønder Klitvej 84, 6960 Hvide Sande		
Haurvig Båke		Sønder Klitvej 0, 6960 Hvide Sande		
Haurvig Redningsstation		Sønder Klitvej 72, 6960 Hvide Sande		
Haurvig Redningsstation		Sønder Klitvej 72, 6960 Hvide Sande		
Haurvig Redningsstation		Sønder Klitvej 72, 6960 Hvide Sande		
Holmsland Klitvej 117		Holmsland Klitvej 117, 6960 Hvide Sande		
Holmsland Klitvej 117		Holmsland Klitvej 117, 6960 Hvide Sande		
Holmsland Klitvej 117		Holmsland Klitvej 117, 6960 Hvide Sande		
Holmsland Klitvej 117		Holmsland Klitvej 117, 6960 Hvide Sande		
Nørre Lyngvig, Marie Fjords Gård		Holmsland Klitvej 91, 6960 Hvide Sande		
Nørre Lyngvig, Marie Fjords Gård		Holmsland Klitvej 91, 6960 Hvide Sande		
Sønder Klitvej 282		Sønder Klitvej 282, 6960 Hvide Sande		
Sønder Klitvej 282		Sønder Klitvej 282, 6960 Hvide Sande		
Sønder Klitvej 282		Sønder Klitvej 282, 6960 Hvide Sande		
Sønder Klitvej 282		Sønder Klitvej 282, 6960 Hvide Sande		
Sønder Klitvej 282		Sønder Klitvej 282, 6960 Hvide Sande		
Åregab Båke		Søndergade 0, 6960 Hvide Sande		

=== 6971 Spjald ===
Listing name	Image	Location	Coordinates	Description
Brejninggård		Brejninggårdsvej 12, 6971 Spjald		

=== 6990 Ulfborg ===
Listing name	Image	Location	Coordinates	Description
Fjordgården		Husby Klitvej 23, 6990 Ulfborg		
Fjordgården		Husby Klitvej 23, 6990 Ulfborg		
Fjordgården		Husby Klitvej 23, 6990 Ulfborg		
Fjordgården		Husby Klitvej 23, 6990 Ulfborg		
Fjordgården		Husby Klitvej 23, 6990 Ulfborg		
Husby Klit Båke		Husby Klitvej 0, 6990 Ulfborg		
Fjordgården		Husby Klitvej 33, 6990 Ulfborg		
Fjordgården		Husby Klitvej 33, 6990 Ulfborg		
Fjordgården		Husby Klitvej 33, 6990 Ulfborg		
Fjordgården		Husby Klitvej 33, 6990 Ulfborg		
Fjordgården		Husby Klitvej 33, 6990 Ulfborg		
Strandgården		Husby Klitvej 5, 6990 Ulfborg		
Strandgården		Husby Klitvej 5, 6990 Ulfborg		
Strandgården		Husby Klitvej 5, 6990 Ulfborg		
Strandgården		Husby Klitvej 5, 6990 Ulfborg		
Vedersø Klit Båke		Vedersø Klitvej 0, 6990 Ulfborg		

== Delisted ==
Listing name	Image	Location	Coordinates	Description
Nørregade 2		Nørregade 2, 6950 Ringkøbing		
Vestergade 5		Vestergade 5A, 6950 Ringkøbing		
