= Herborg =

- Village
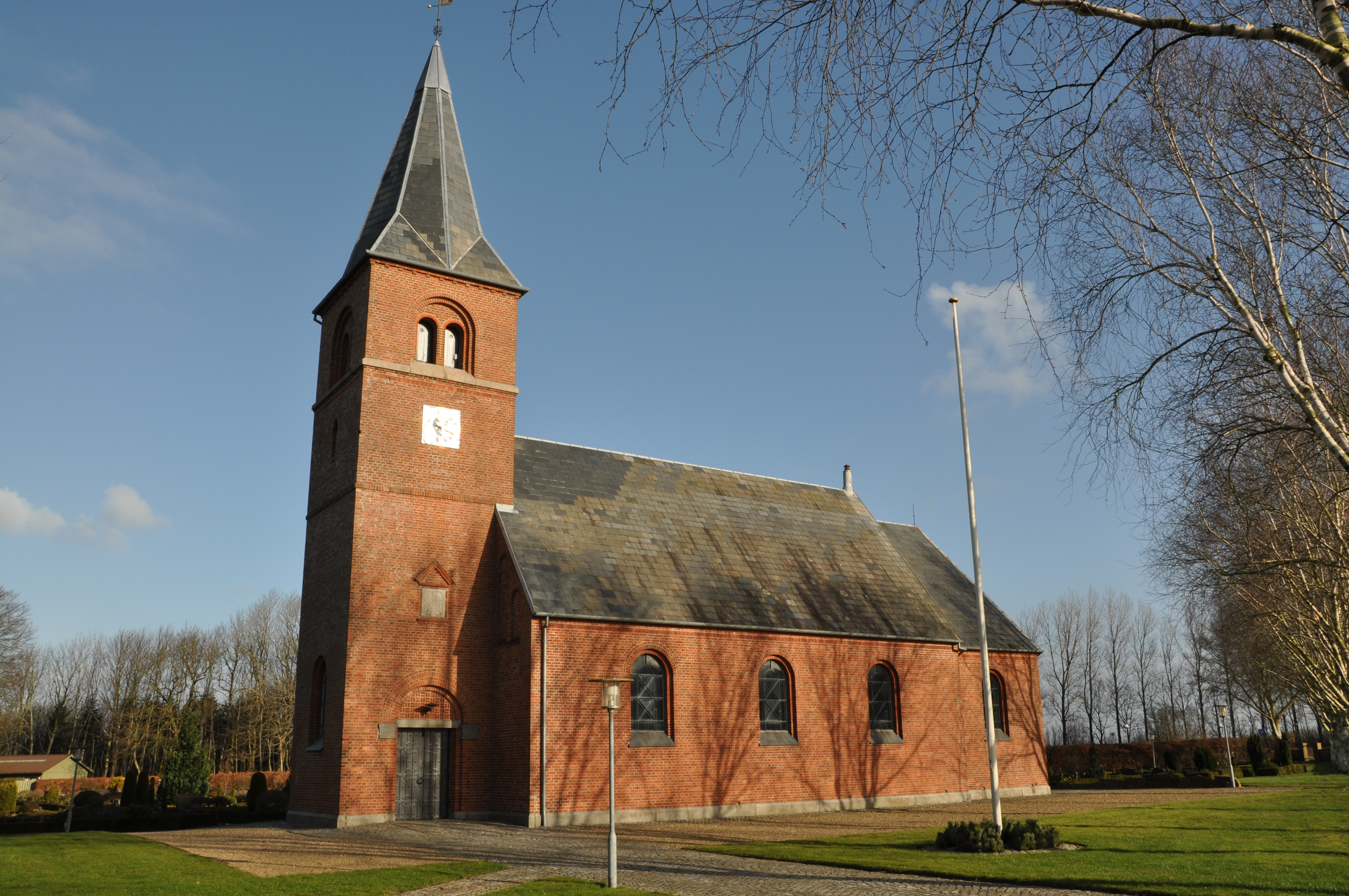
- Herborg Church

- Location in Central Denmark Region Herborg (Denmark)
- Coordinates: 56°3′58″N 8°35′56″E
- Country: Denmark
- Region: Central Denmark (Midtjylland)
- Municipality: Ringkøbing-Skjern

Population (2026)
  - Total: 266

Herborg is a small village, with a population of 266 (1 January 2026), in Ringkøbing-Skjern Municipality, Central Denmark Region in Denmark. It is located 27 km west of Herning, 4 km southwest of Videbæk, 18 km north of Skjern and 23 km east of Ringkøbing.

Herborg Church, built during 1898–99, is located in the village.
