= Ølstrup =

- Village
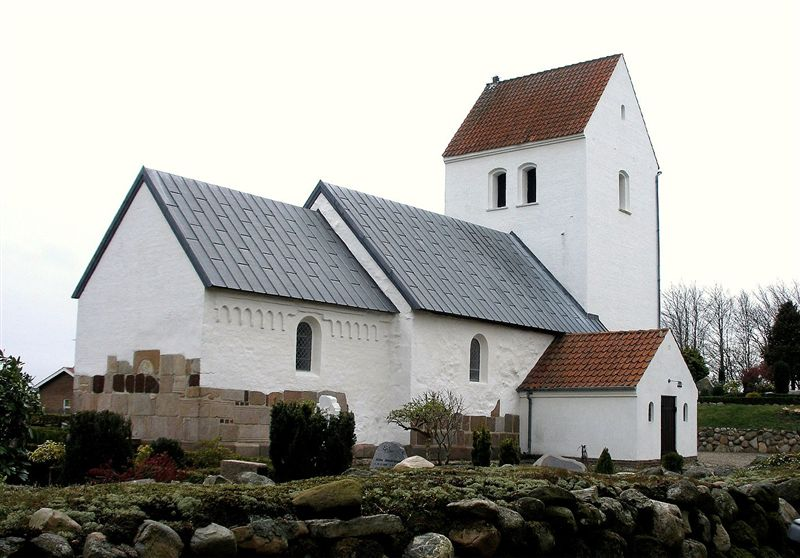
- Ølstrup Church

- Location in Central Denmark Region Ølstrup (Denmark)
- Coordinates: 56°6′42″N 8°25′23″E
- Country: Denmark
- Region: Central Denmark (Midtjylland)
- Municipality: Ringkøbing-Skjern

Population (2026)
  - Total: 304

Ølstrup is a village, with a population of 304 (1 January 2026), in Ringkøbing-Skjern Municipality, Central Denmark Region in Denmark. It is located 6 km west of Spjald, 15 km west of Videbæk and 13 km east of Ringkøbing.

Ølstrup Church built around 1180 is located in the village.
