= Fjelstervang =

- Village
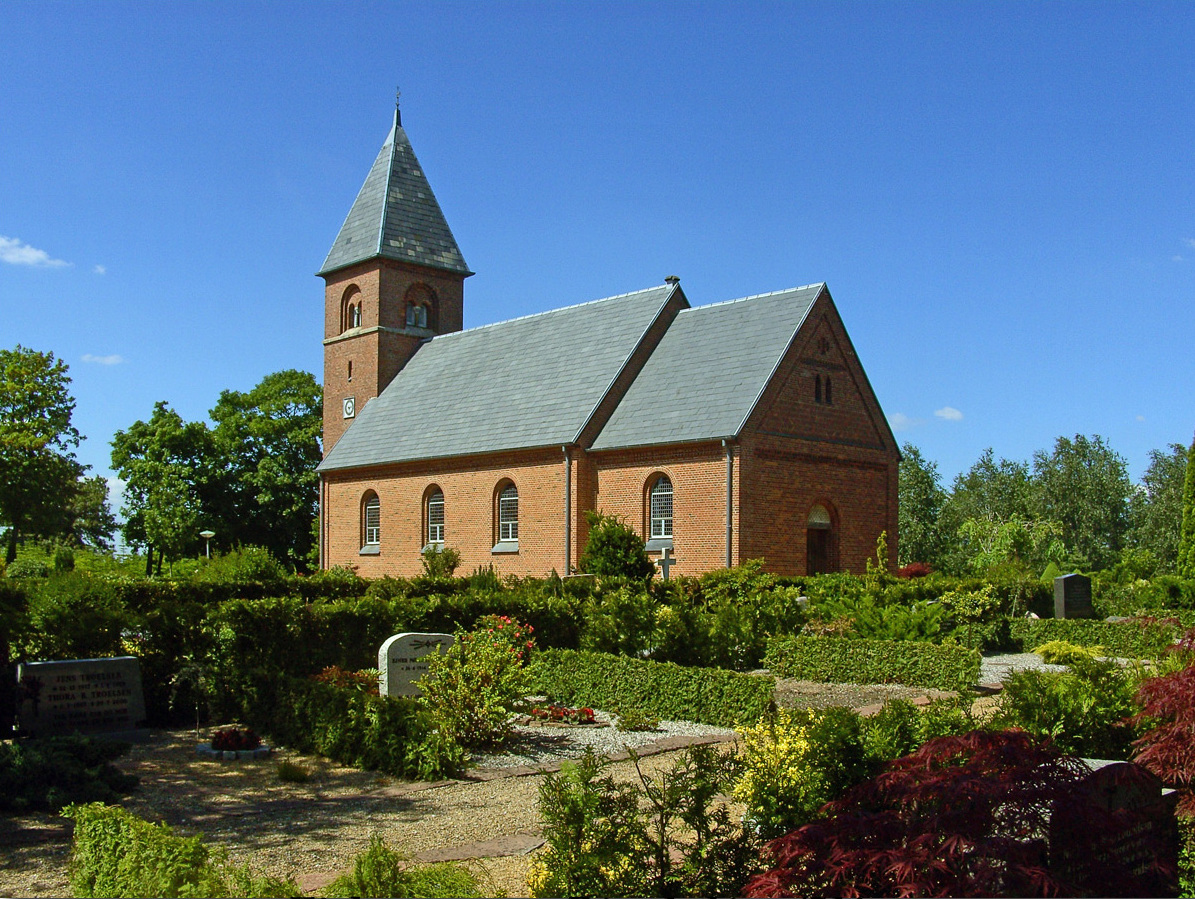
- Fjelstervang Church

- Location in Central Denmark Region Fjelstervang (Denmark)
- Coordinates: 56°4′22″N 8°49′9″E
- Country: Denmark
- Region: Central Denmark (Midtjylland)
- Municipality: Ringkøbing-Skjern

Population (2026)
  - Total: 441

Fjelstervang is a village, with a population of 441 (1 January 2026), in Ringkøbing-Skjern Municipality, Central Denmark Region in Denmark. It is located 5 km north of Kibæk, 13 km east of Videbæk and 15 km southwest of Herning.

Fjelstervang Church built in 1898 is one out of many churches from the period where people cultivated the moor in the western part of Jutland.

"Børnenes Allé Fjelstervang" (The Children's Allée Fjelstervang) is the name of three institutions in Fjelstervang: The nursery and kindergarten, the school and the after school care.
