= Hemmet =

- Village
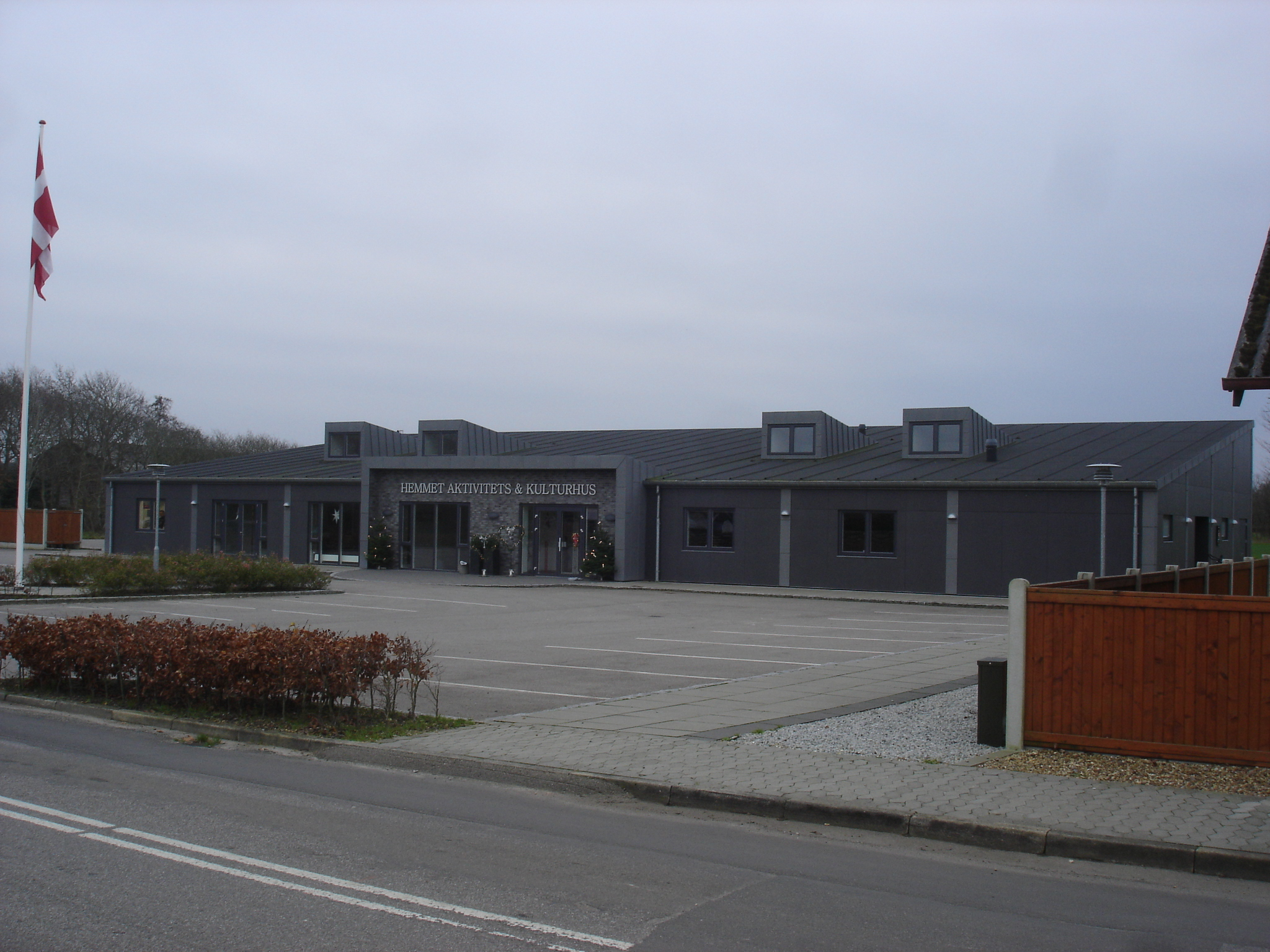
- Hemmet Activity & Culture House

- Location in Central Denmark Region Hemmet (Denmark)
- Coordinates: 55°51′0″N 8°22′38″E
- Country: Denmark
- Region: Central Denmark (Midtjylland)
- Municipality: Ringkøbing-Skjern

Population (2026)
  - Village: 285

Hemmet is a village and parish in the former Egvad Municipality (Danish: Egvad kommune), which since 1 January 2007 has been part of the Ringkøbing-Skjern Municipality, Midtjylland, near the west coast of Jutland in Denmark. Hemmet has a village population of 285 (1 January 2026) and a parish population of 518 (1 January 2026). The word "Hemmet" derives from prior Danish, meaning "The home".

Hemmet is located 11 km northeast of Nørre Nebel, 12 km southwest of Tarm and 15 km southwest of Skjern.

== Education ==
In the early 1990s, the town of Hemmet had a school, but it was abolished since it was deemed too small. Afterwards, pupils from Hemmet had to attend the private Christian school in Sønder Vium, 4 km east of Hemmet or the public school 5 km south of Hemmet located in Nørre Bork, where the "Bork Havn Musikfestival" is staged. In Hemmet there is a kindergarten, holding around 100 pupils

=== Nearby schools ===
- Sdr. Vium Friskole
- Bork Skole
- Tarm Skole - Overbygningen
- Tarm Skole - Byskolen

== Events ==
Hemmet has its own harbor, which is about 1000 m^{2} large. At the harbor, each summer a havnefest (harbour feast) is held.

The town has a football team playing in the 6th series of Danish football. It shares its name with the nearby city of Sønder Vium, which Hemmet also bonds with. The football team is called "HSV IF", formerly "HSV '82".

== Religion ==
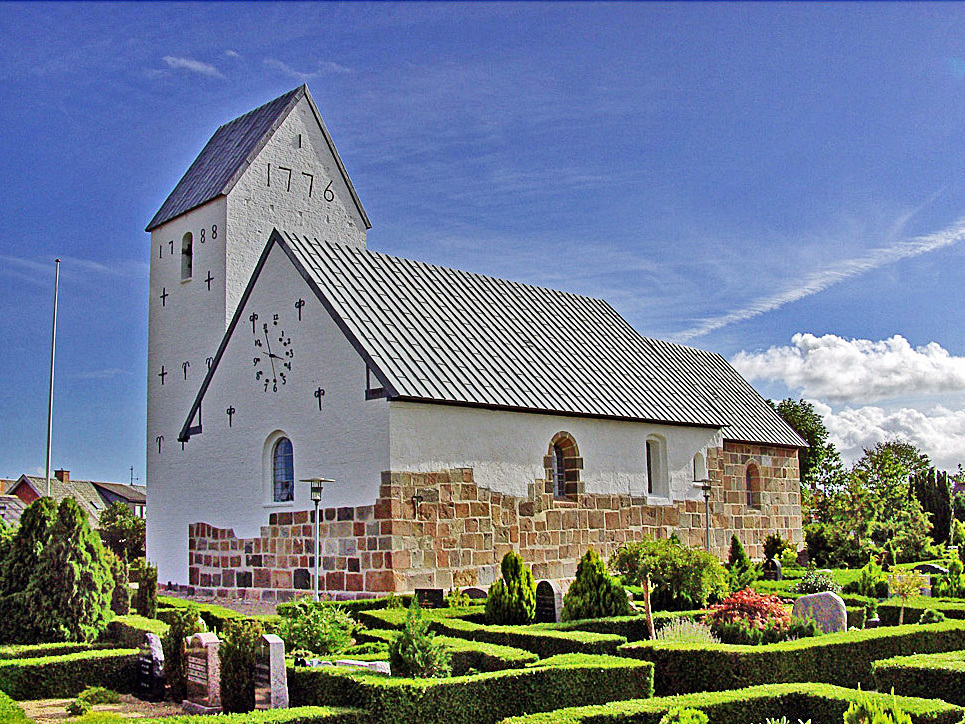
Hemmet Church

Hemmet Church is located in the village. It is known by many Christians in the area, because of the priest Martin Jensen. He is known because of his inner mission way of speaking. Not all citizens in Hemmet are Christians though.
