= Hoven =

Hoven may refer to:

== Places ==
- Hoven, Denmark
- Hoven, South Dakota
- Hoven (Zülpich), a part of the town Zülpich, Kreis Euskirchen, Nordrhein-Westfalen

== People ==
- Waldemar Hoven (1903–1948), German Nazi physician executed for war crimes
