= Rækker Mølle =

- Village
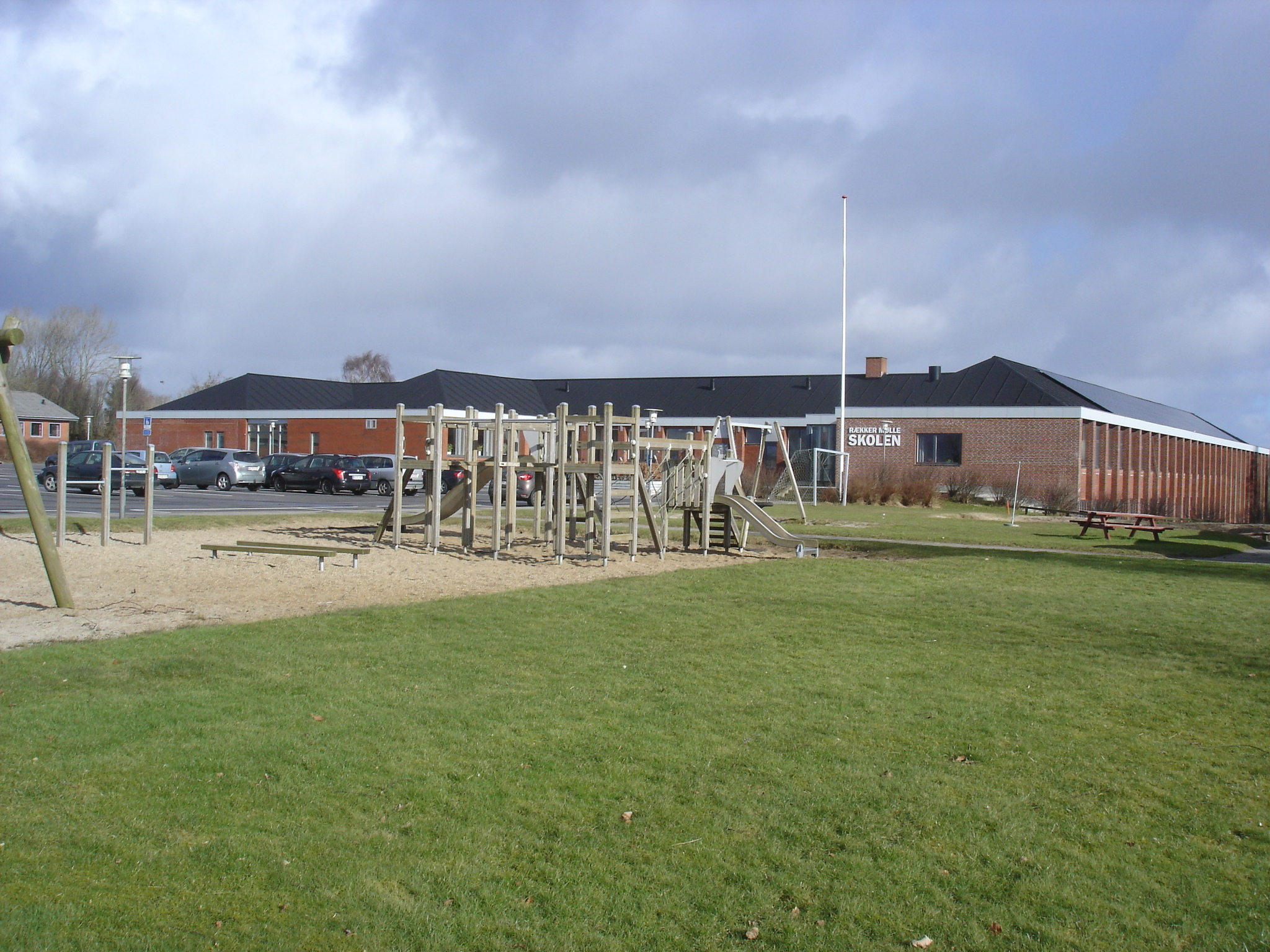
- The Rækker Mølle School

- Location in Central Denmark Region Rækker Mølle (Denmark)
- Coordinates: 56°1′17″N 8°32′10″E
- Country: Denmark
- Region: Central Denmark (Midtjylland)
- Municipality: Ringkøbing-Skjern

Population (2026)
  - Total: 321

Rækker Mølle is a village, with a population of 321 (1 January 2026), in Ringkøbing-Skjern Municipality, Central Denmark Region in Denmark. It is located 34 km southwest of Herning, 11 km southwest of Videbæk, 12 km north of Skjern and 22 km southeast of Ringkøbing.

Rækker Mølle Håndbold (Rækker Mølle Handball) is the local handball team in the village currently (2025–26) playing in the Danish 1st Division.
