= Højmark =

- Village
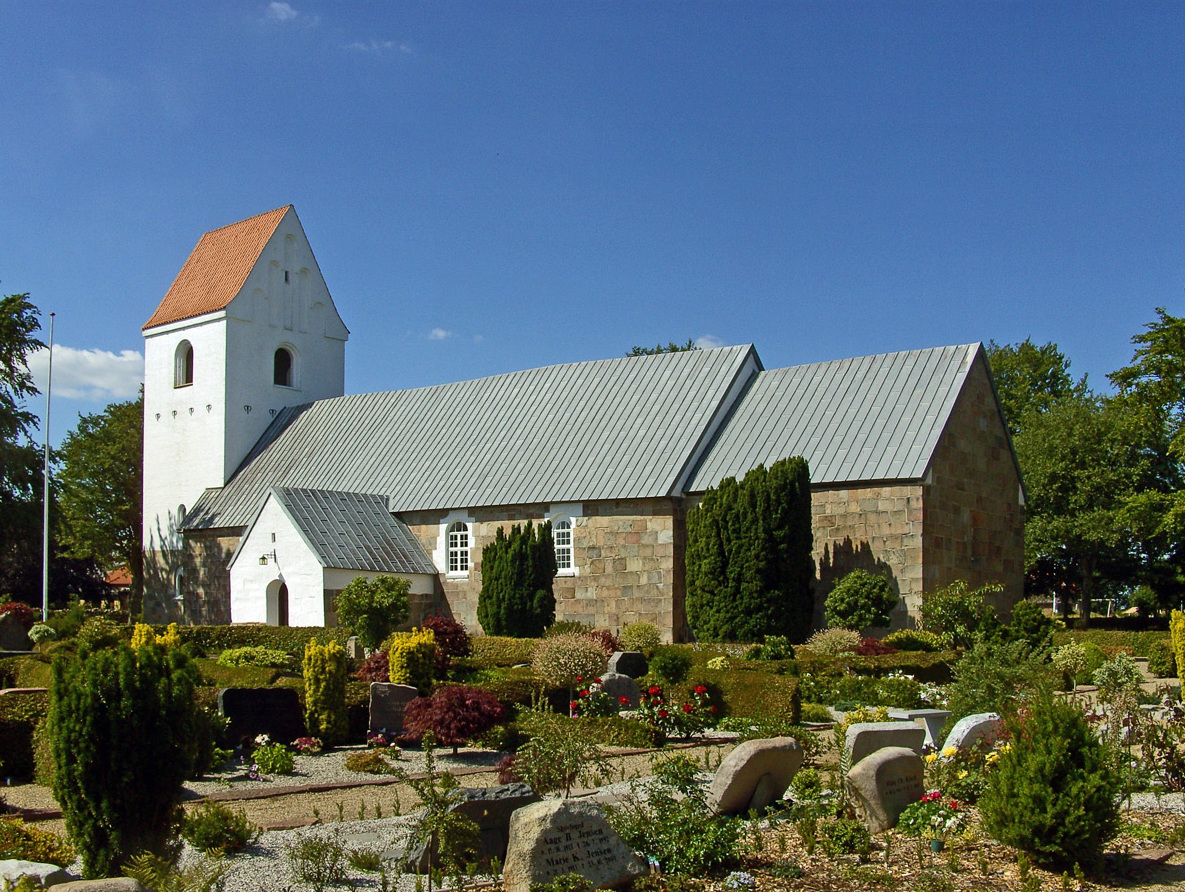
- Sønder Lem Church in Højmark

- Location in Central Denmark Region Højmark (Denmark)
- Coordinates: 56°3′11″N 8°24′5″E
- Country: Denmark
- Region: Central Denmark (Midtjylland)
- Municipality: Ringkøbing-Skjern
- Parish: Sønder Lem Parish

Population (2026)
  - Total: 284

Højmark is a small village, with a population of 284 (1 January 2026), in Ringkøbing-Skjern Municipality, Central Denmark Region in Denmark. It is located 4 km north of Lem, 12 km east of Ringkøbing and 41 km west of Herning.

Højmark is a part of Sønder Lem Parish and the parish church Sønder Lem Church is located on the eastern outskirts of the village.
