= Jens Lund (sculptor) =

Danish sculptor (1873–1946)

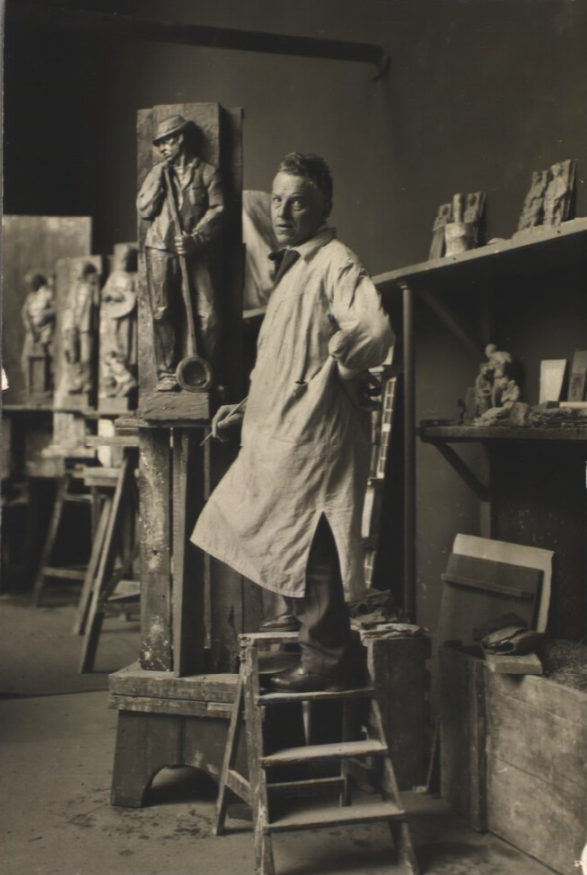
- Jens Lund in his studio, 1910
- Born: 5 February 1873; Videbæk, Denmark
- Died: 30 May 1946 (aged 73); Copenhagen, Denmark
- Resting place: Bispebjerg Cemetery
- Education: Royal Danish Academy of Fine Arts
- Occupation: Sculptor
- Movement: Skønvirke

Jens Lund Jensen (6 February 1873 – 30 May 1946) was a Danish sculptor.

== Early life and education ==
Lund was born in 1883 in Videbæk, the son of innkeeper, merchant and farmer Jens Jensen Lund (1824–1909) and Johanne Nielsen (1831–80). He initially apprenticed both as a house painter and a diarist before training as a woodcarver under Sophus Petersen and Bertel Olsen for the age of 21 while at the same time attending Copenhagen Technical School. He studied at the Royal Danish Academy of Fine Arts from 1896 to 1901. He also worked as an assistant in Vilhelm Bissen's and Anders Bundgaard's studios.

He spent three months in Italy and four months in Paris in 1906. Lund visited Egypt, Greece and Italy on a grant from Ankers Legat in 1914 and Germany and Austria on a grant from Zacharias Jacobsens Legat in 1922. He also made a study trip to the Netherlands and Germany in 1930.

== Career ==
Lund was represented at the Charlottenborg Spring Exhibition in 1900 and 1902–08 as well as the Charlottenborg Autumn Exhibition in 1904–05 and 1907. He was also represented at exhibitions in Brighton (1912), Stockholm (Liljevalchs konsthall, 1919), Gothenburg (1923 and 1939), New York City (Brooklyn Museum, 1927), and Oslo (1931).

Kund was a member of the Den Frie Udstilling from 1911.

He was awarded the Eckersberg Medal in 1919 for a bust in oak, Kunstgips Ferdinandsen, and again in 1920 for Ægyptere.

Lund worked with restoration of sculptures at the National Gallery of Denmark from 1914.

He was a member of Akademirådet from March 1922, a member of the Gallery Commission in 1923–29 and was chairman of the Society for Decorative Arts (Selskabet for dekorativ kunst) and the Sculptors Association (Billedhuggerforeningen), a board member of Den Frie Udstilling and the Danish Sculptor Society (Dansk billedhuggersamfund).

Lund was knighted in the Order of the Dannebrog in 1934. He died in Copenhagen during 1946 and was buried at Bispebjerg Cemetery.

== Selected works ==
- People in national costumes Copenhagen Central Station (1910)
- 12 craftsmen, Technical Institute, Copenhagen (1916–17)
- Boundary Stone, Tuborgvej, Copenhagen (1926)
- Water feature, Nordisk Livsforsikrings, Grønningen, Copenhagen (1929, now Assurand.gård, Frederiksberg)
- The Seasons, Gyldenløvesgade, Copenhagen (1929–31, moved)
- Authumn, Østerbrogade/Jagtvejen (1931),
- Reunion Memorial, Ulkebøl, Als (1936)

== Image gallery ==
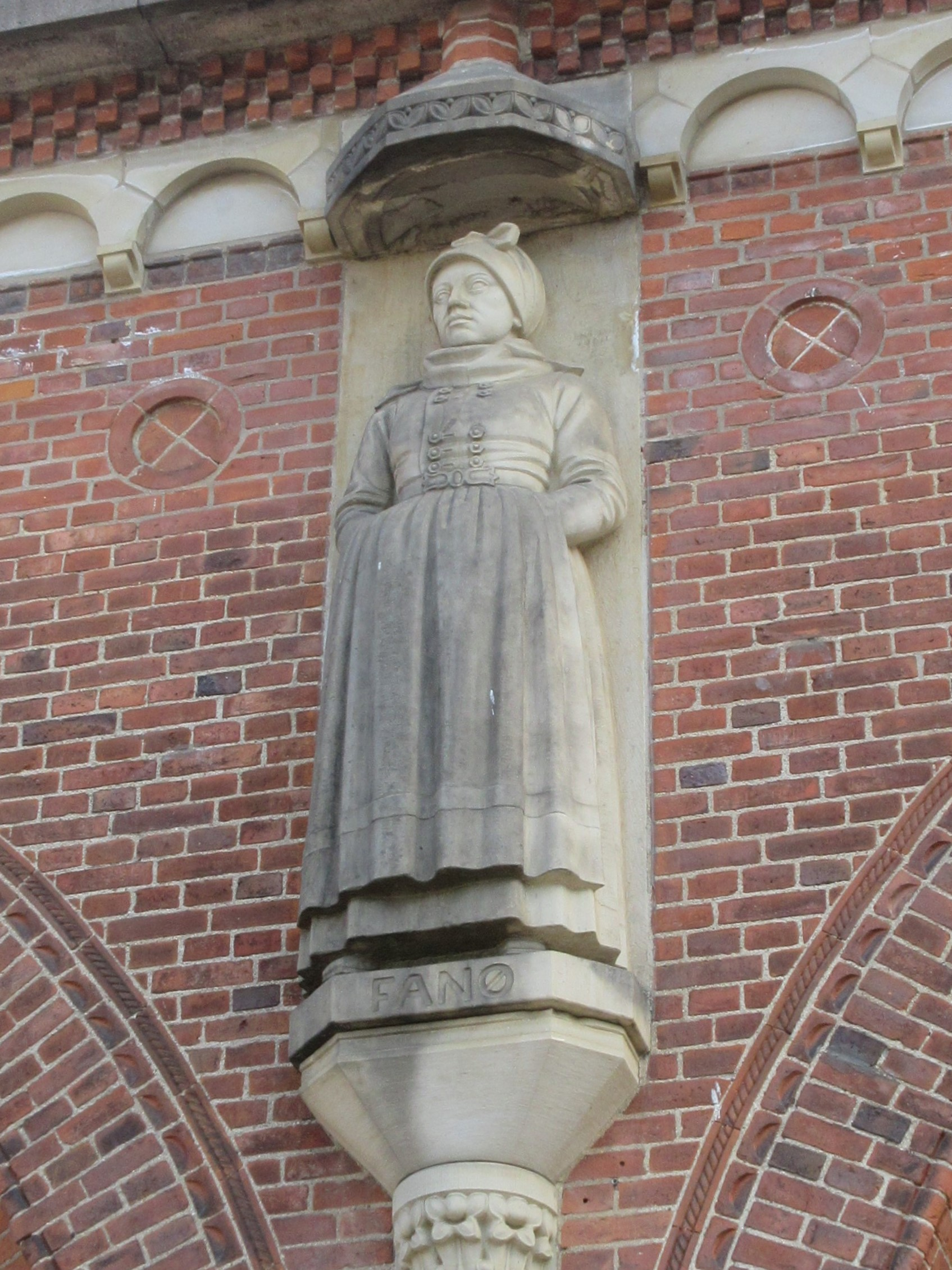
Fanø Woman
Copenhagen Central Station

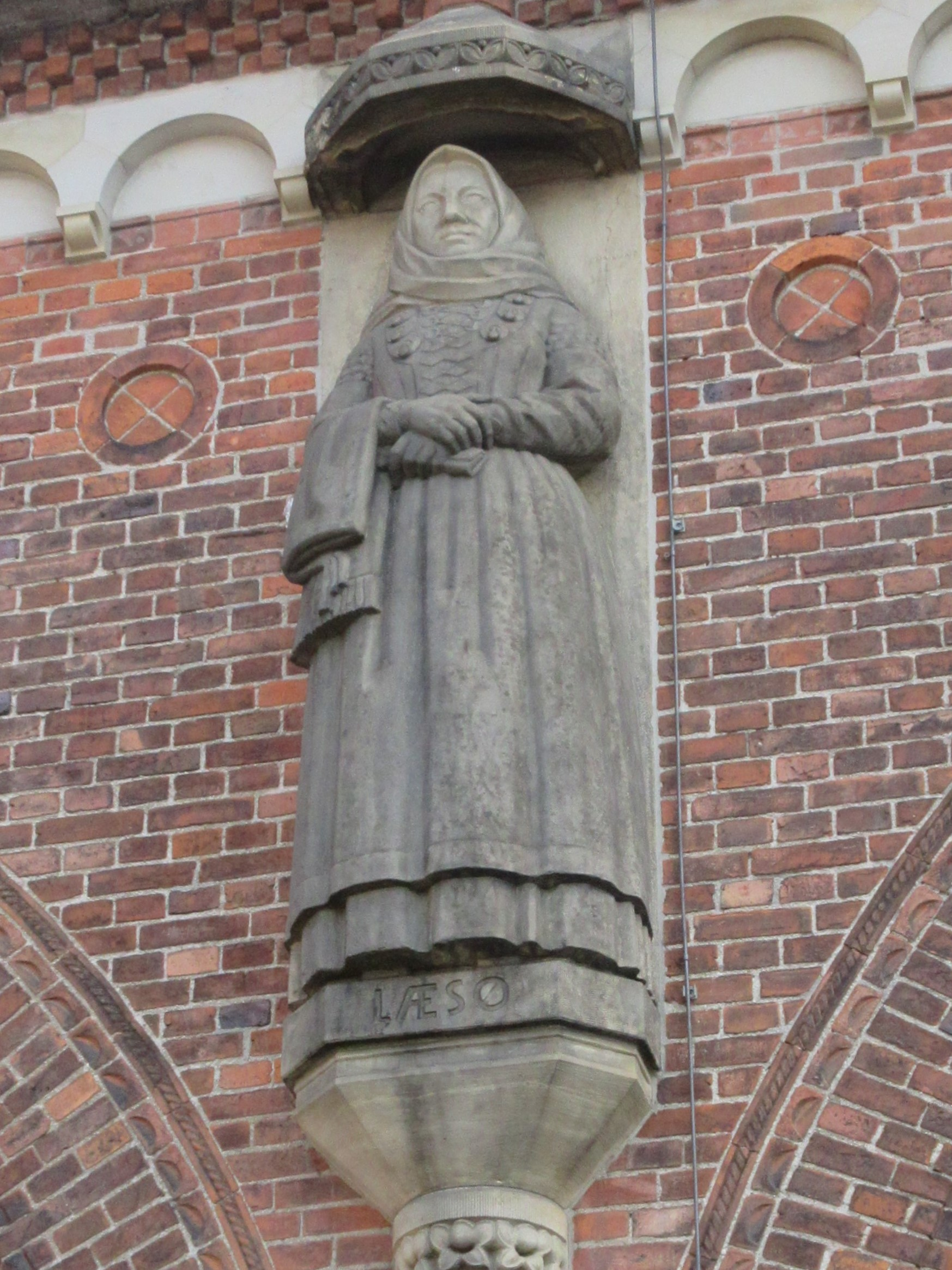
Læsø Woman
Copenhagen Central Station

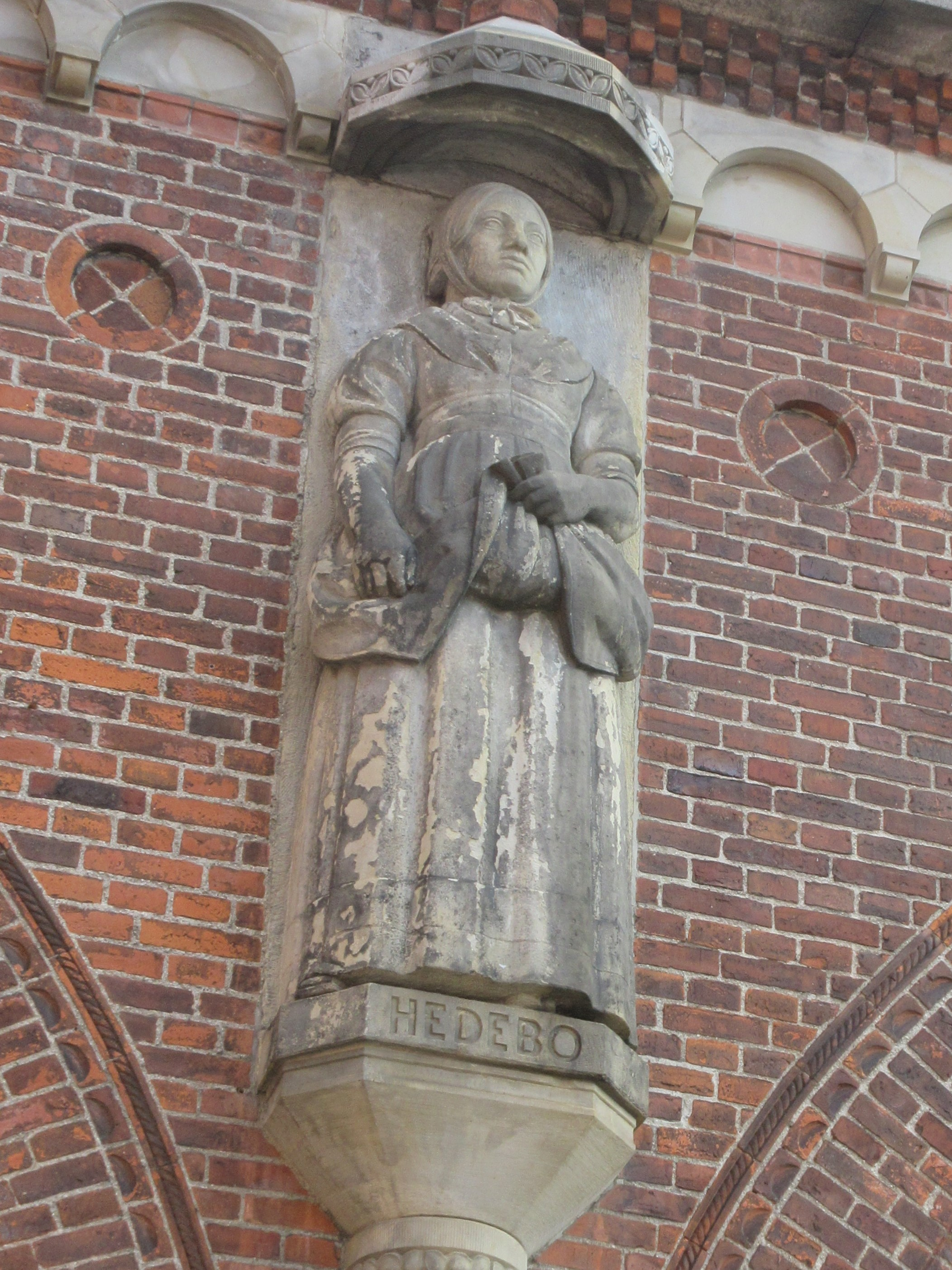
Hedebo Woman
Copenhagen Central Station

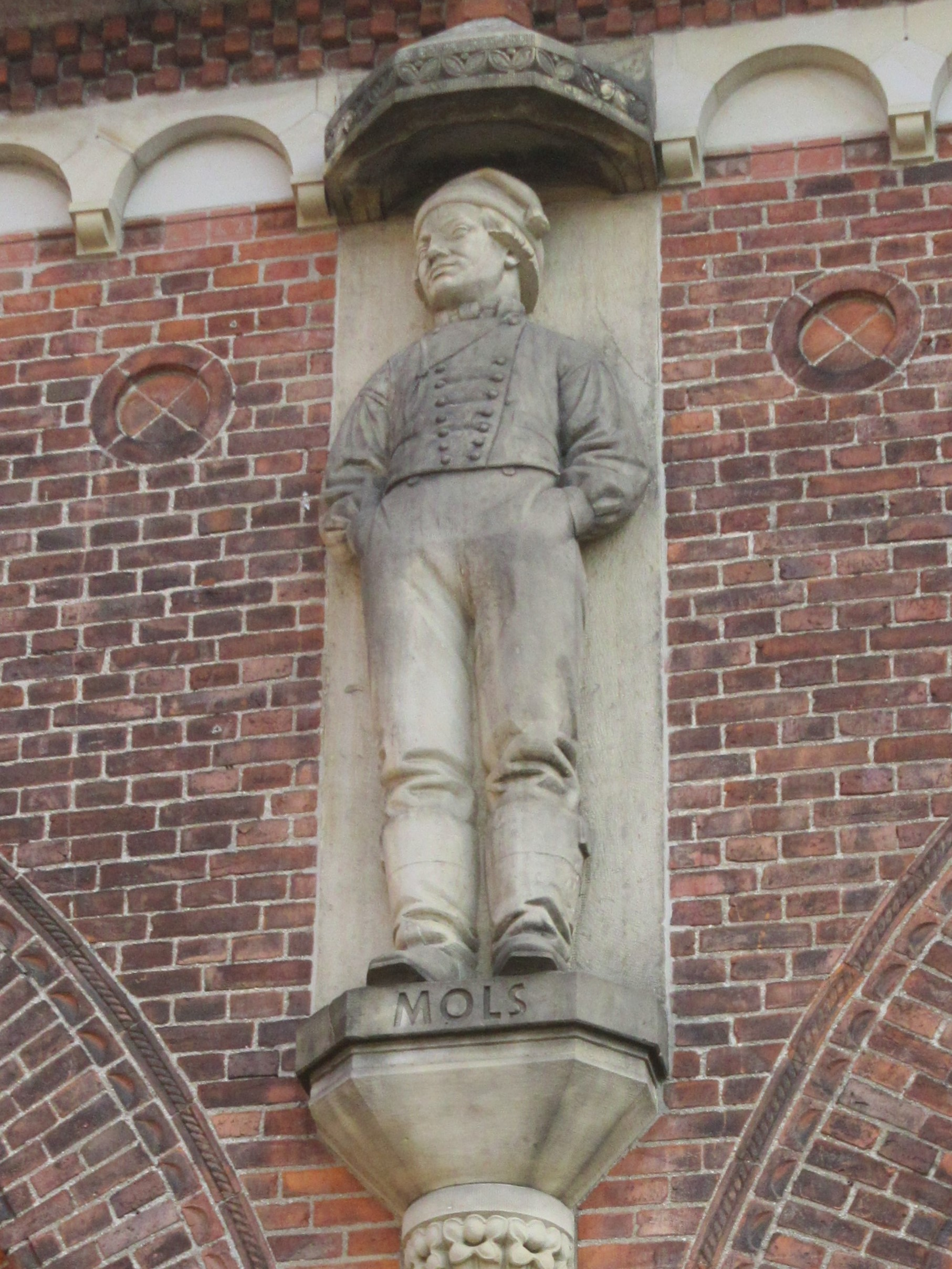
Mols Man
Copenhagen Central Station

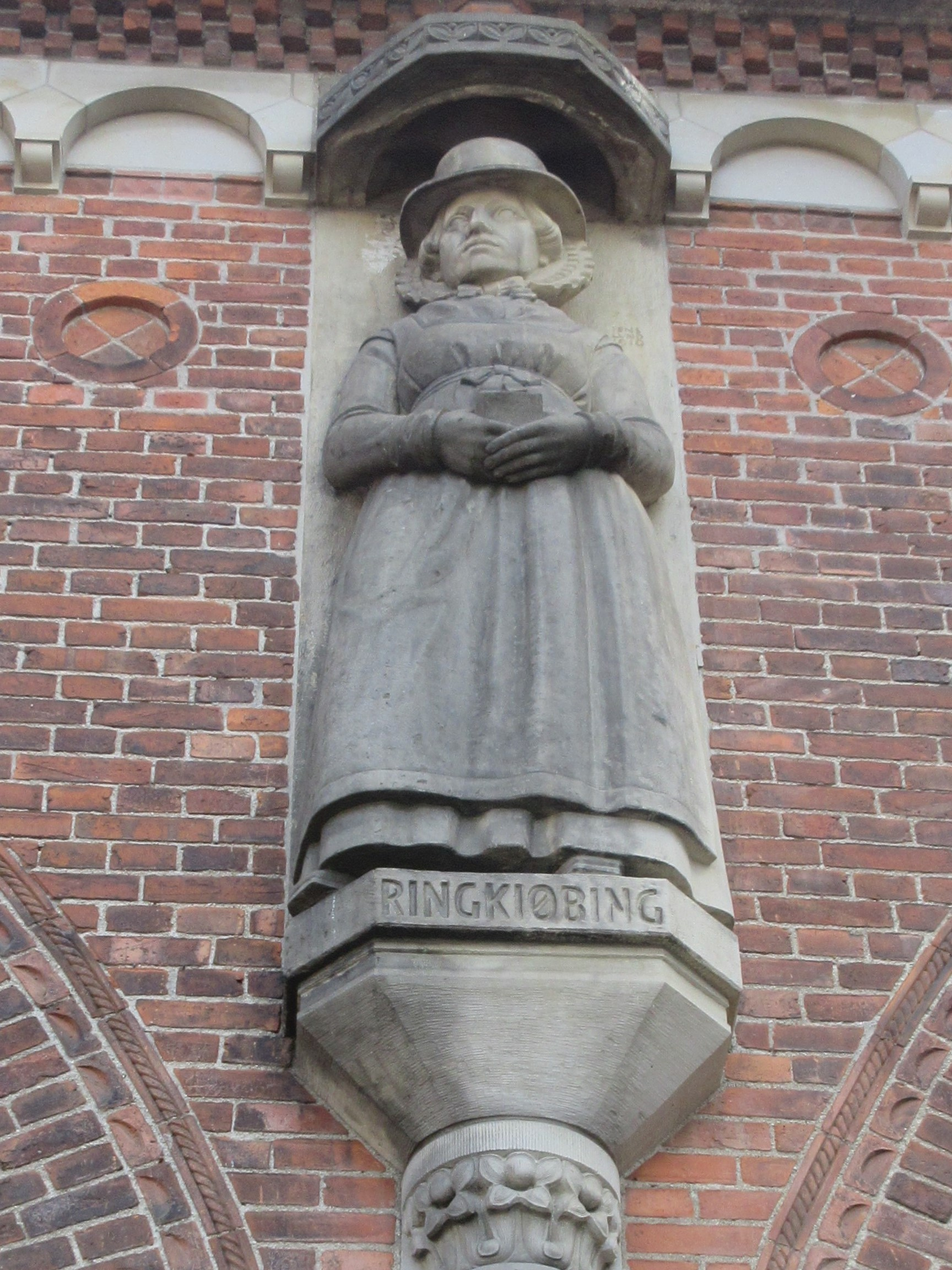
Ringkøbing Man
Copenhagen Central Station

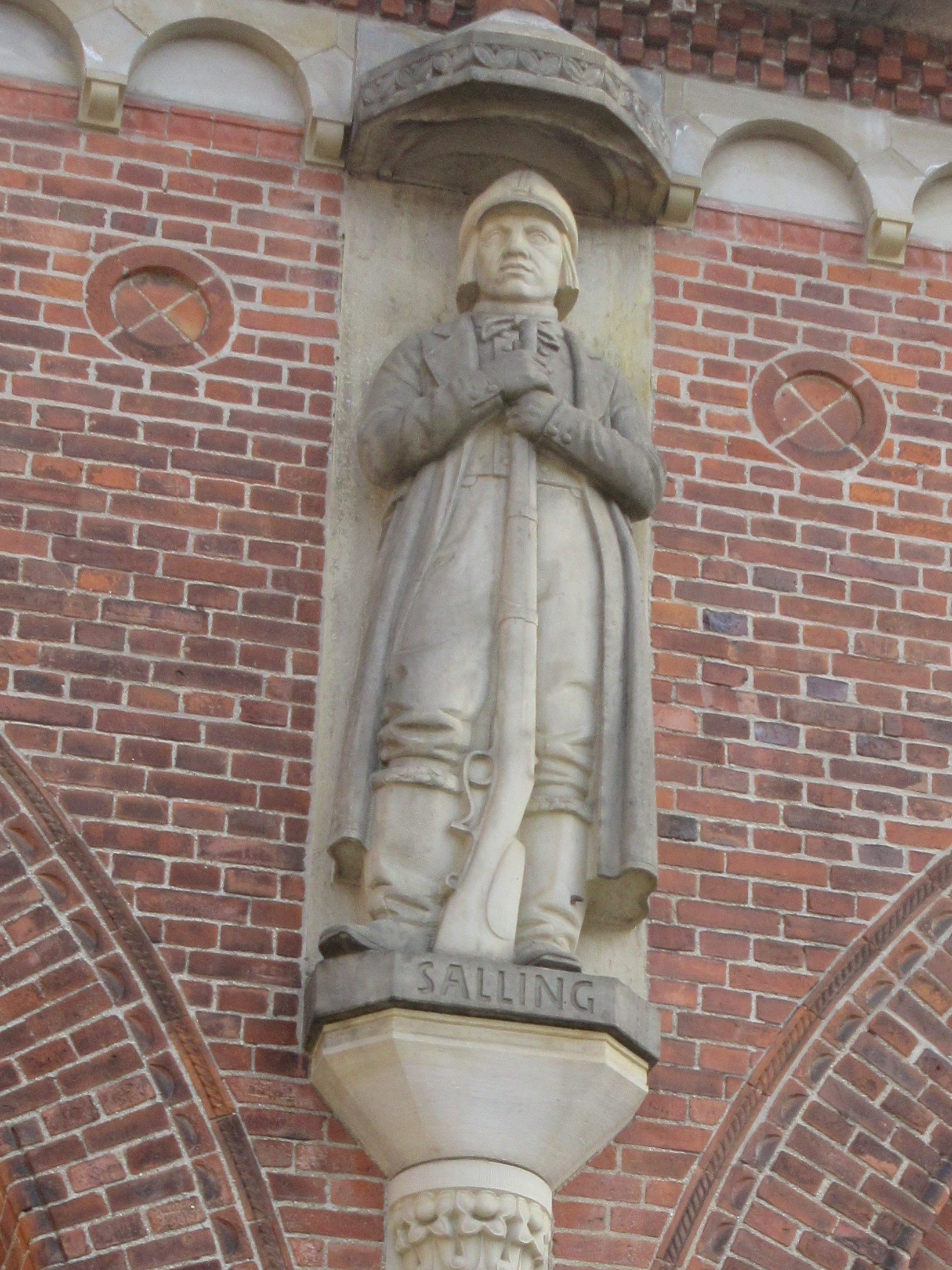
Salling Man
Copenhagen Central Station

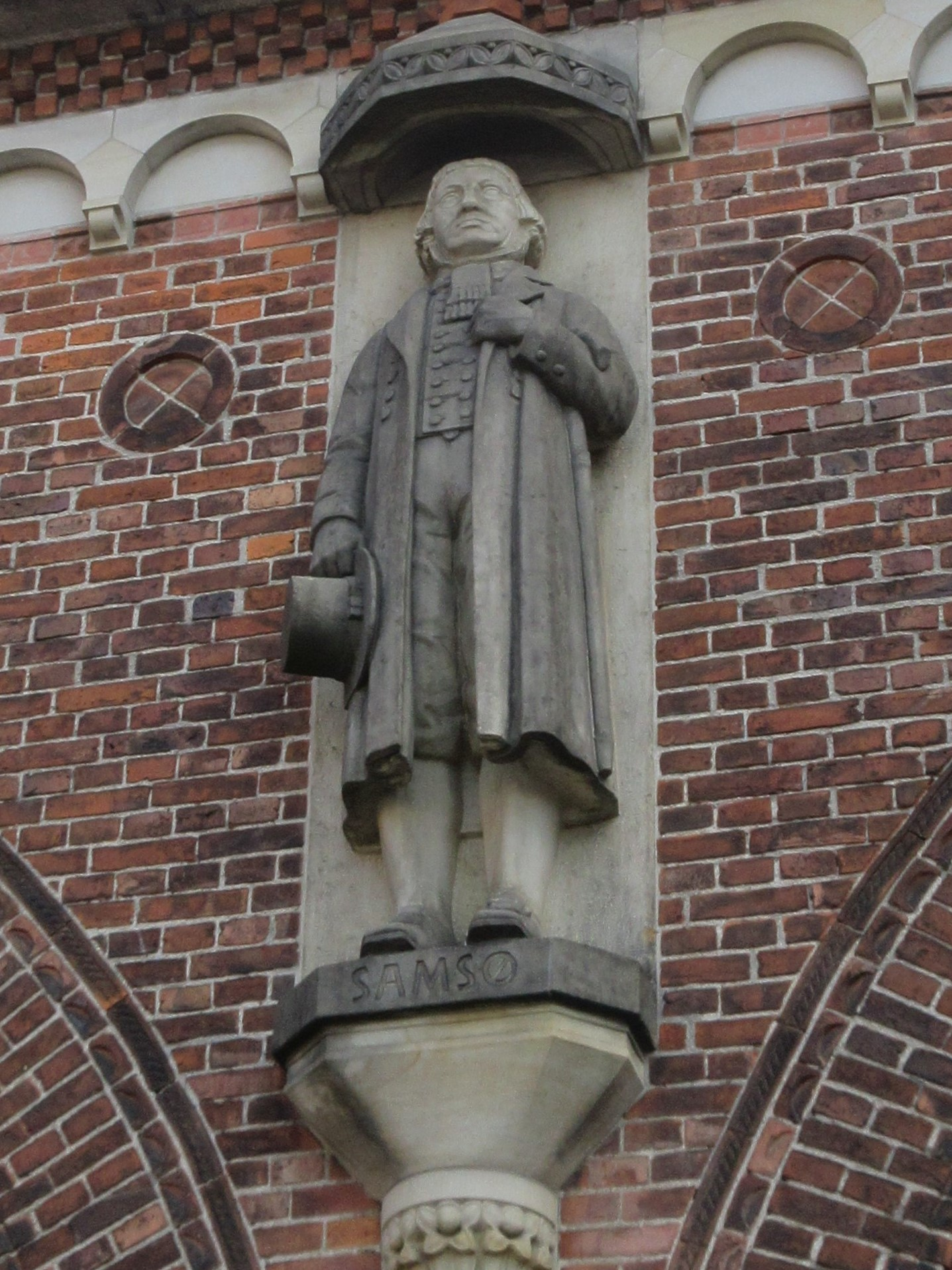
Samsø Man
Copenhagen Central Station

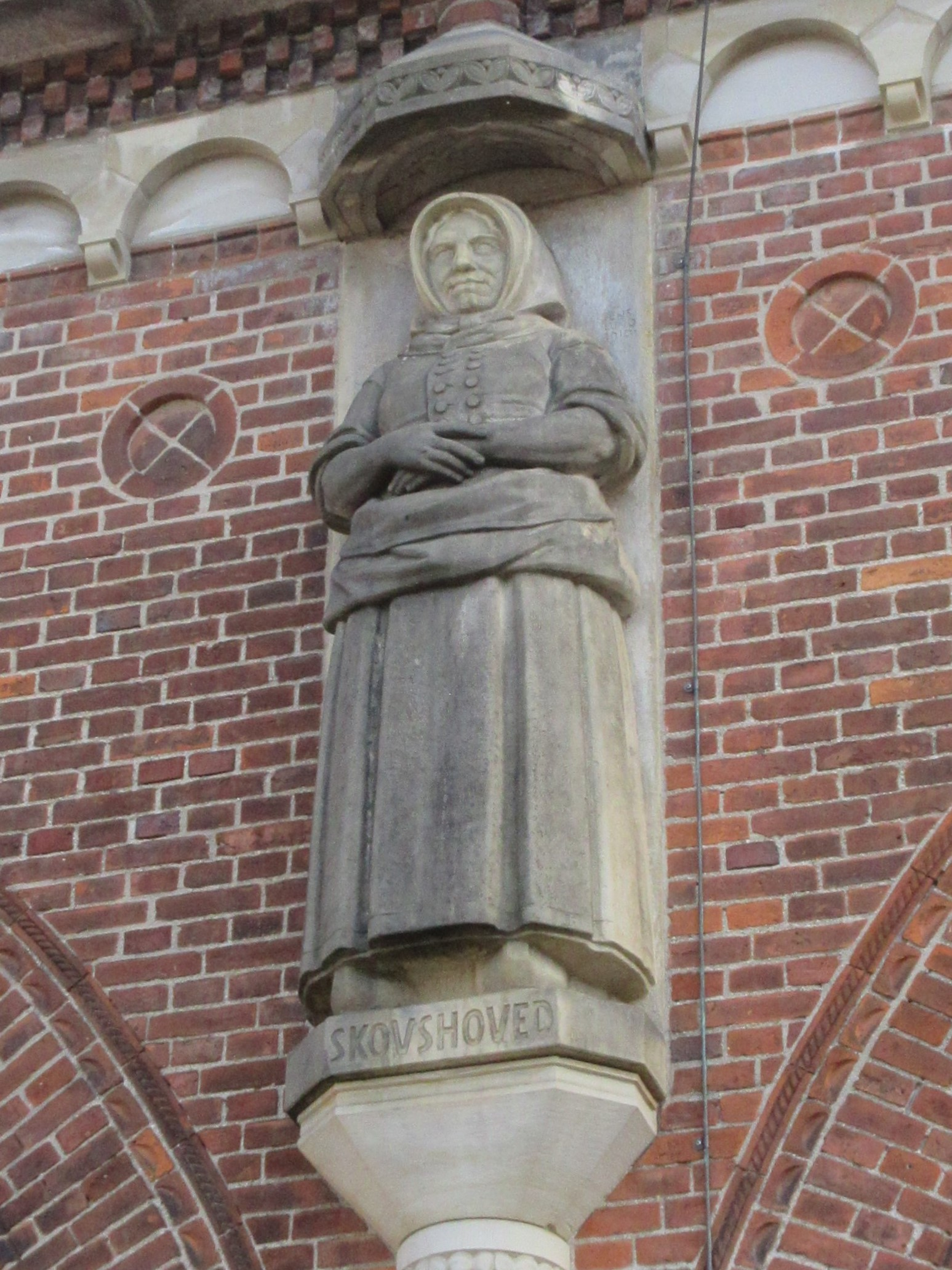
Skovshoved Woman
Copenhagen Central Station

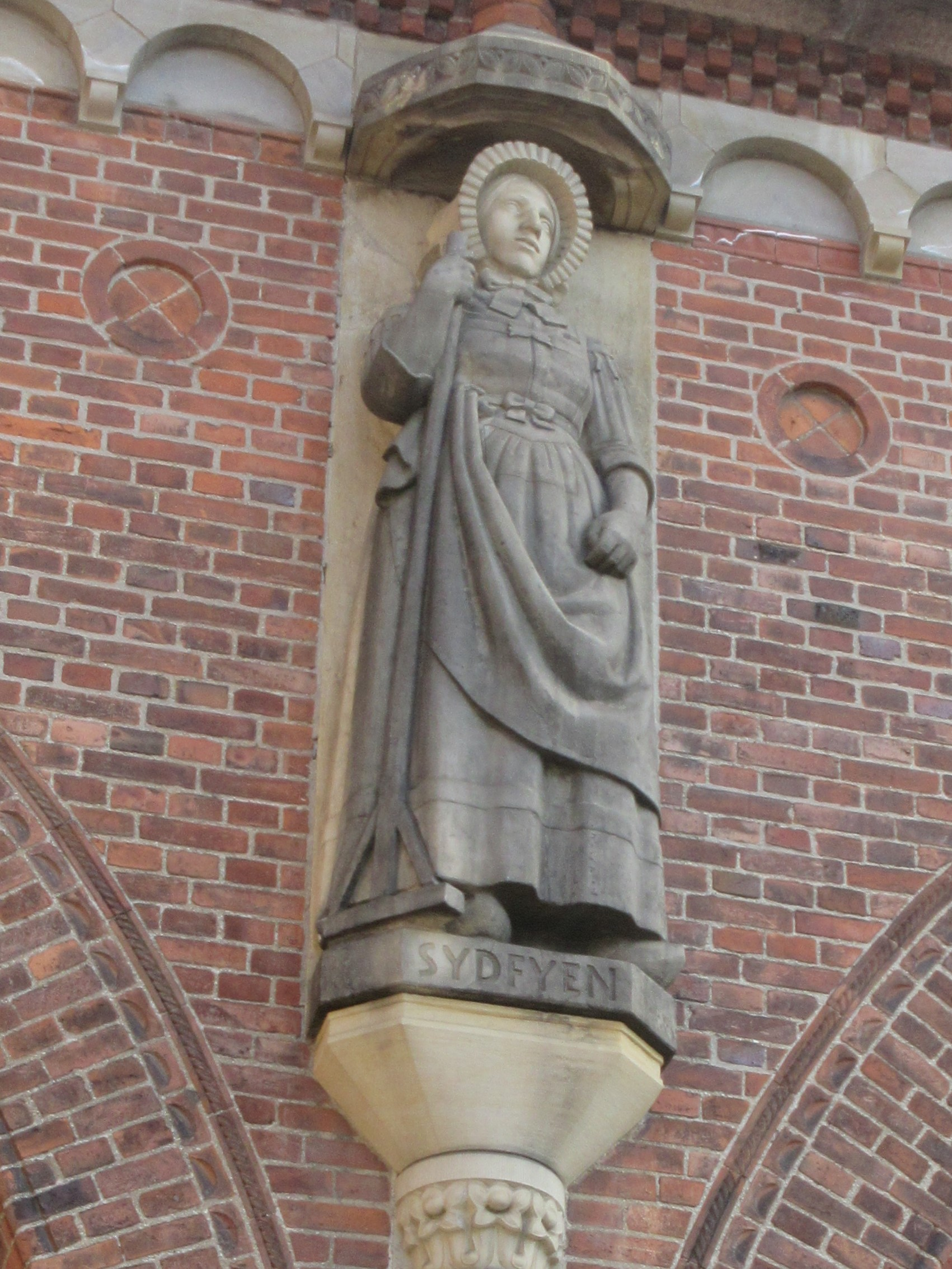
South Funen Woman
Copenhagen Central Station

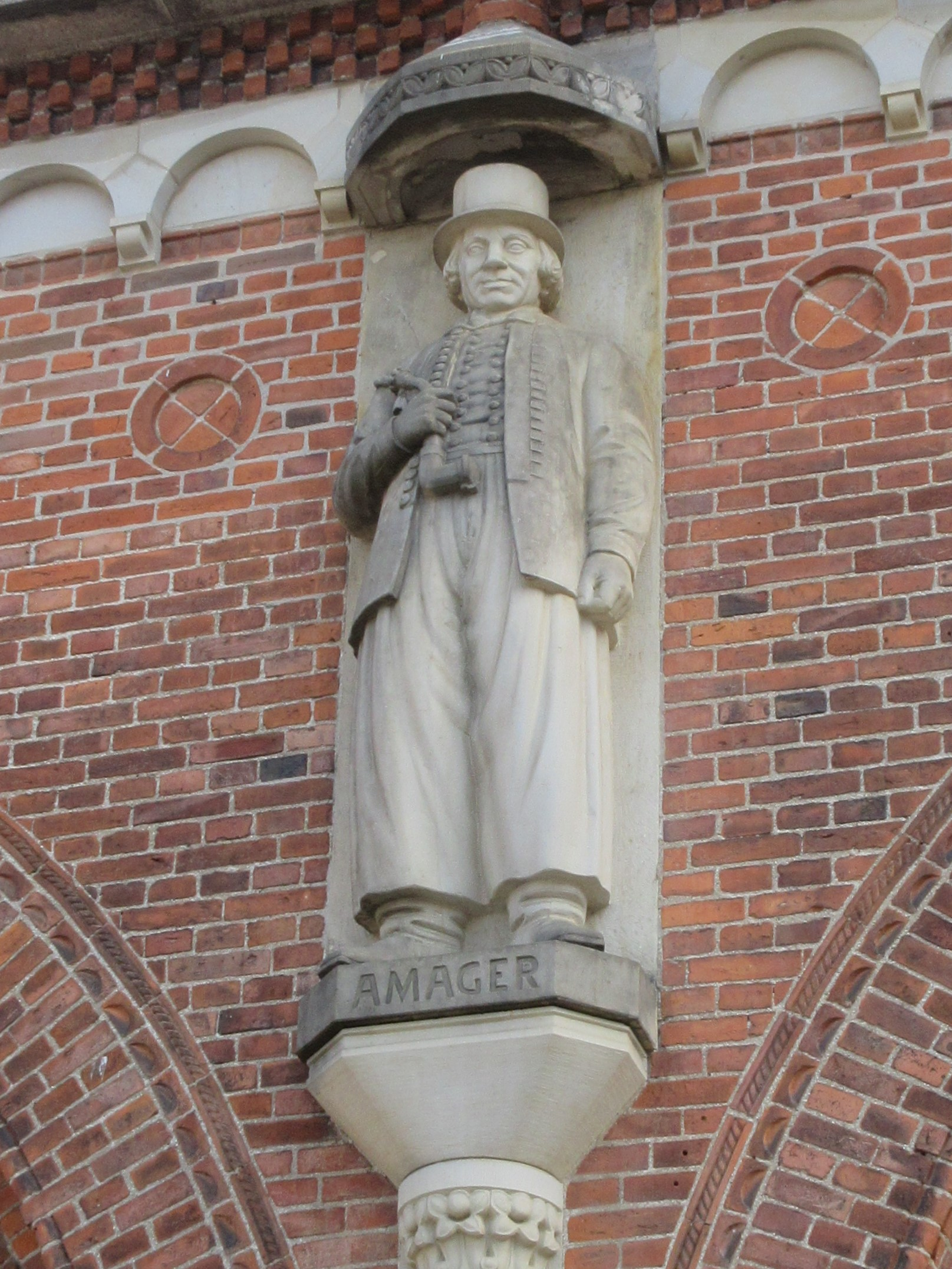
Amager Man
Copenhagen Central Station
