= Ådum =

Village in Ringkøbing-Skjern, Central Denmark

- village
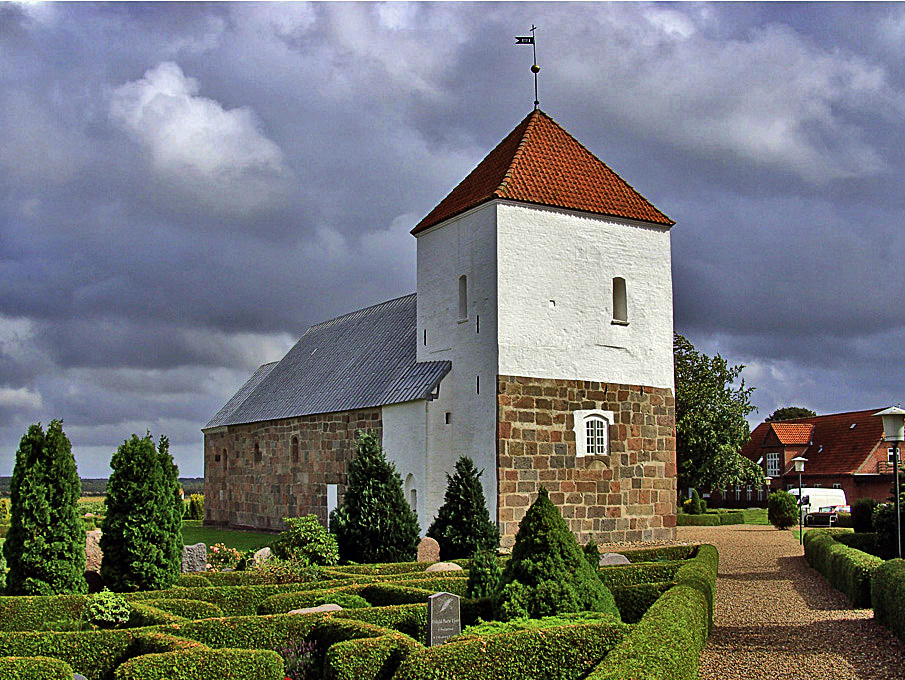
- Ådum Church

- Location in Central Denmark Region Ådum (Denmark)
- Coordinates: 55°52′28″N 8°35′37″E
- Country: Denmark
- Region: Central Denmark (Midtjylland)
- Municipality: Ringkøbing-Skjern

Population (2026)
  - Total: 227

Ådum is a small village in Ringkøbing-Skjern Municipality in Denmark. It is located 12 kilometres (7.5 mi) southeast of Skjern, 6 kilometres (3.7 mi) southeast of Tarm and 30 kilometres (19 mi) northwest of Grindsted and has a population of 227 (1 January 2026).

Ådum Church is located in the village.
