= Henrik Have =

Danish visual artist and author

- Born: 14 March 1946; Gladsaxe, Denmark
- Died: 12 September 2014 (aged 68); Hvide Sande, Denmark
- Occupations: Painter and author

Henrik Have (14 March 1946 – 12 September 2014) was a Danish visual artist and author. His father Helmer Andreas Have was a laborer and farm owner and his mother Carla Christine Bloch was also a laborer. In 1989, he married Anne Katrine Kokholm Nielsen.

He died on 12 September 2014 at the age of 68 following an illness.

He received a Danish Arts Foundation grant for life in 1990, and the Eckersberg Medal and Leo Estvads Grant in 1998.

He was married to Anne Katrine Kokholm Nielsen and worked from a studio in a West Jutland farmhouse.
