= Skjern Municipality =

Former municipality in Denmark

Coordinates: 55°57′N 8°30′E

Skjern Municipality is a former municipality (Danish, kommune) in Ringkøbing-Skjern Municipality in Region Midtjylland near the west coast of the Jutland peninsula in west Denmark. The former Skjern municipality covered an area of 327 km^{2}, and had a total population of 13,107 (2005). The city has a population of 7,563 inhabitants.

The main town was Skjern.

Skjern municipality was created in 1970 due to a kommunalreform ("Municipality Reform") that combined the following, existing parishes:

- Bølling Parish
- Dejbjerg Parish
- Faster Parish
- Fjelstervang Parish
- Hanning Parish
- Skjern Parish
- Stavning Parish
- Sædding Parish
- Sønder Borris Parish

On 1 January 2007 Skjern Municipality ceased to exist due to Kommunalreformen ("The Municipality Reform" of 2007). It was merged with existing Egvad, Holmsland, Ringkøbing, and Videbæk municipalities to form the new Ringkøbing-Skjern Municipality. This created a municipality with an area of 1,485 km^{2} and a total population of 57,818 (2005).
