= North Sea Beach Marathon =

Annual running event in Denmark

North Sea Beach Marathon is an annual Danish marathon which takes place at the westcoast of Jutland. It takes place in the beginning of July, every year. It is one of the only running events in the world where participants run the entire race on sand. Runners can choose to run the full 42.190 kilometres, or the half-marathon, 10 km and 5 km.

Runners must train hard, because running on sand is very demanding on the human body. A difficult portion of the race is Hvide Sande, the sand here feels like deep snow. The timelimit for the marathon is 7 hours.

The arrangers invited Lance Armstrong to participate in the 2007 event, but he decided to turn down the offer.

== Statistics ==
=== Records ===
- Marathon men - 2.36.46 - Jens Henrik Jensen - Denmark (2004)
- Marathon women - 3.00.09 - Joanna Gront - Poland (2005)
- half-marathon men - 1.08.51 - Augustin Togom - Kenya (2005)
- half-marathon women - 1.20.22 - Nina Sørensen- Germany (2005)
- 10 km men - 32.58 - Anders Ejby-Ernst - Denmark (2007)
- 10 km women - 38.16 - Charlotte Larsen - Denmark (2005)
- 5 km men - 16.58 - Jesper Faurschou - Denmark (2002)
- 5 km women - 20.01 - Lisbeth Rasmussen - Denmark (2002)

=== The fastest in 2007 ===
- Men marathon - Hans Mygind - 2.57.14
- Women - Tanja Werniske - 3.39.44
- Men halfmarathon - Joseph Kimisi - 01.15.55
- Women halfmarathon - Marianne Nors Karstensen - 01.33.0
- Men 10 km - Anders Ejby-Ernst - 32.58
- Women 10 km - Charlotte Larsen - 39.28
- Men 5 km - Morten Fransen - 17.09
- Women 5 km - Rachel Jacobsen - 22.17
