= Velling =

- Village
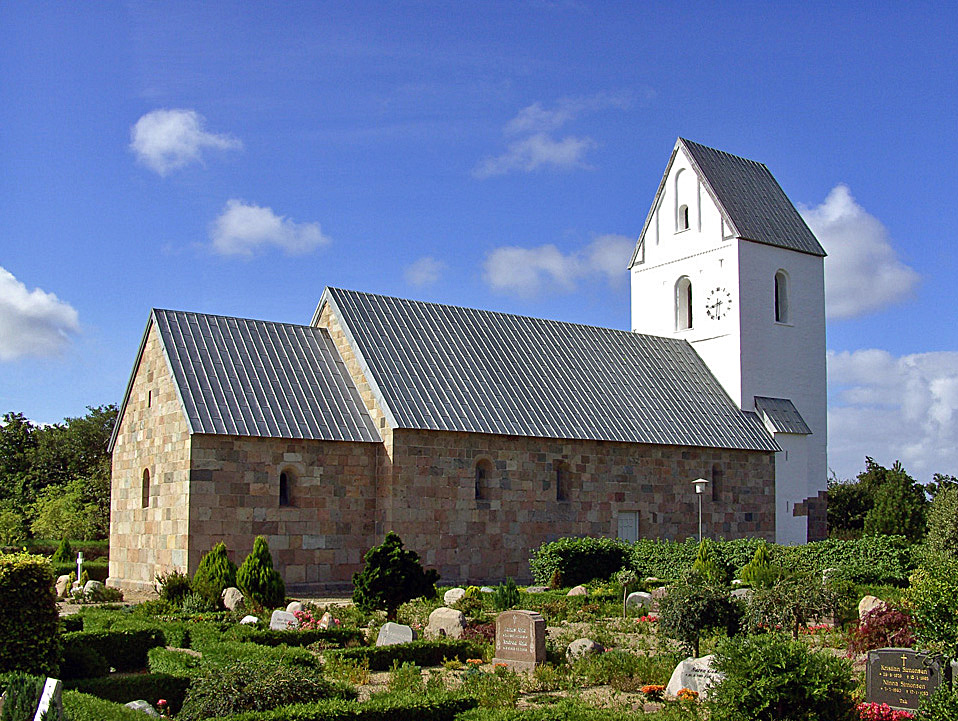
- Velling Church

- Location within Central Denmark Region Location within Denmark
- Coordinates: 56°3′8″N 8°18′40″E
- Country: Denmark
- Region: Central Denmark (Midtjylland)
- Municipality: Ringkøbing-Skjern

Population (2026)
  - Total: 242

Velling Kirkeby is a small village in West Denmark on the peninsula of Jutland with a population of only 242 (1 January 2026). It is positioned next to the Ringkøbing Fjord which, with its shallow waters combined with the stable west wind, is popular with wind and kitesurfers. The village belongs to Ringkøbing-Skjern Municipality.

The parish church dates to the middle of the 12th century (app. 1150) and is built in the romanesque style.

Despite the modest size of the village, it has three schools built on the Danish "free school" (friskoleloven) and "public enlightenment" traditions in the parish. The schools are; Velling Friskole, Fjordvang Efterskole and Vestjyllands Højskole.
