= Egvad Municipality =

Former municipality in Denmark

Coordinates: 55°54′32″N 8°31′06″E

Until 1 January 2007 Egvad was a municipality (Danish: kommune) in Ringkjøbing County near the west coast of the Jutland peninsula in west Denmark. The municipality covered an area of 377 square kilometres [km^{2}] (146 sq mi), and had a total population of 9,396 (2005). Its last mayor was Kent Skaanning. The municipality's main town and the site of its municipal council was Tarm. Ringkøbing Fjord defined its northwestern border.

Egvad municipality ceased to exist due to Kommunalreformen ("The Municipality Reform" of 2007). It will be merged with existing Holmsland, Ringkøbing, Skjern, and Videbæk municipalities to form the new Ringkøbing-Skjern Municipality. This created a municipality with an area of 1,485 km^{2} (573 sq mi) and a total population of 57,818 (2005). The new municipality belongs to the new Region Midtjylland ("Mid-Jutland Region").
