= Hoven, Denmark =

Village in Denmark

Hoven
- Village
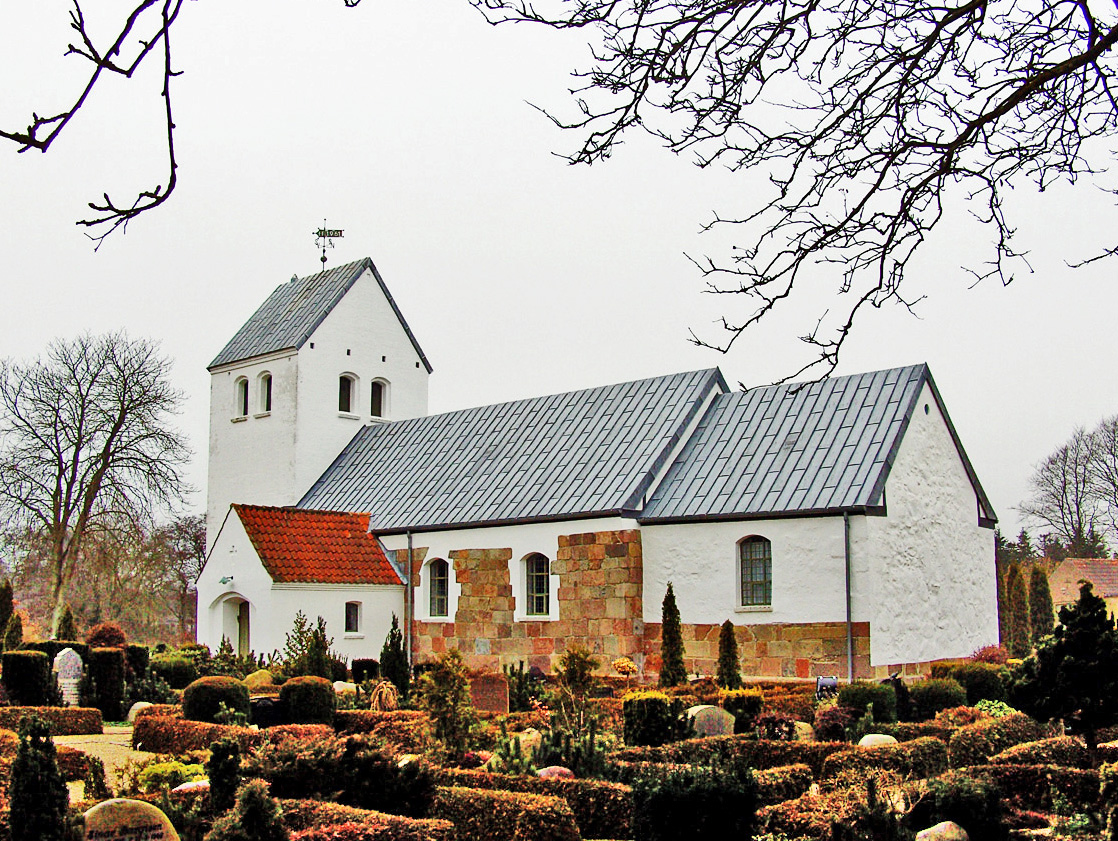
- Hoven Church

- Location in Central Denmark Region Hoven (Denmark)
- Coordinates: 55°51′2″N 8°45′33″E
- Country: Denmark
- Region: Central Denmark (Midtjylland)
- Municipality: Ringkøbing-Skjern

Population (2026)
  - Total: 201

Hoven is a small village in west-central Denmark, with a population of 201 (1 January 2026), on the Jutland Peninsula. It is located in Ringkøbing-Skjern Municipality, Central Denmark Region, southwest of Herning at an elevation of 20 metres.

Hoven Church is a Middle Age Church originally in Romanesque style.

The old schoolhouse in Hoven is now a museum.
