= Vorgod-Barde =

- Urban area
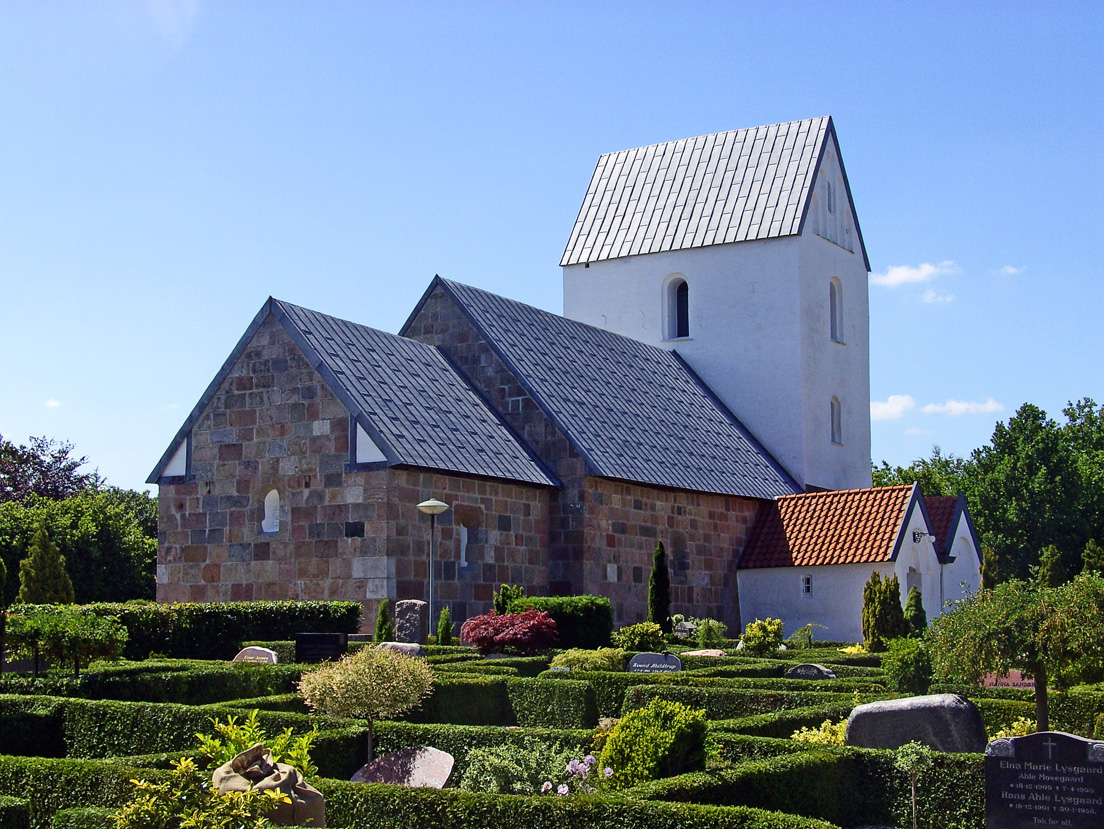
- Vorgod Church

- Location in Central Denmark Region Vorgod-Barde (Denmark)
- Coordinates: 56°5′39″N 8°42′10″E
- Country: Denmark
- Region: Central Denmark ("Midtjylland")
- Municipality: Ringkøbing-Skjern

Area
  - Urban: 0.9 km^{2} (0.35 sq mi)

Population (2026)
  - Urban: 1,003
  - Urban density: 1,100/km^{2} (2,900/sq mi)
- Time zone: UTC+1 (CET)
  - Summer (DST): UTC+2 (CEST)
- Postal code: DK-6920 Videbæk

Vorgod-Barde was formed in 2009, when the former villages of Vorgod and Barde merged into a small urban area with a population of 1,003 (1 January 2026), situated in Ringkøbing-Skjern Municipality, Central Denmark Region in Denmark.

Vorgod-Barde is located 5 km east of Videbæk and 17 km west of Herning.

Vorgod Church is located in Vorgod on the southern end of the urban area.

The local museum (Videbæk egnsmuseum) is located just west of Vorgod. It opened in 2002 on an old family farm with stables, a barn and a machine house. The collection features farm and handicraft machinery and tools, as well as household daily items that are typical of the daily life in the area. It also has a collection of Danish elves (nisser) dolls that were donated by Ellen Bredahl, formerly holder of the Guinness Record for the largest collection of these popular Danish dolls.
