= Hvide Sande =

- Town
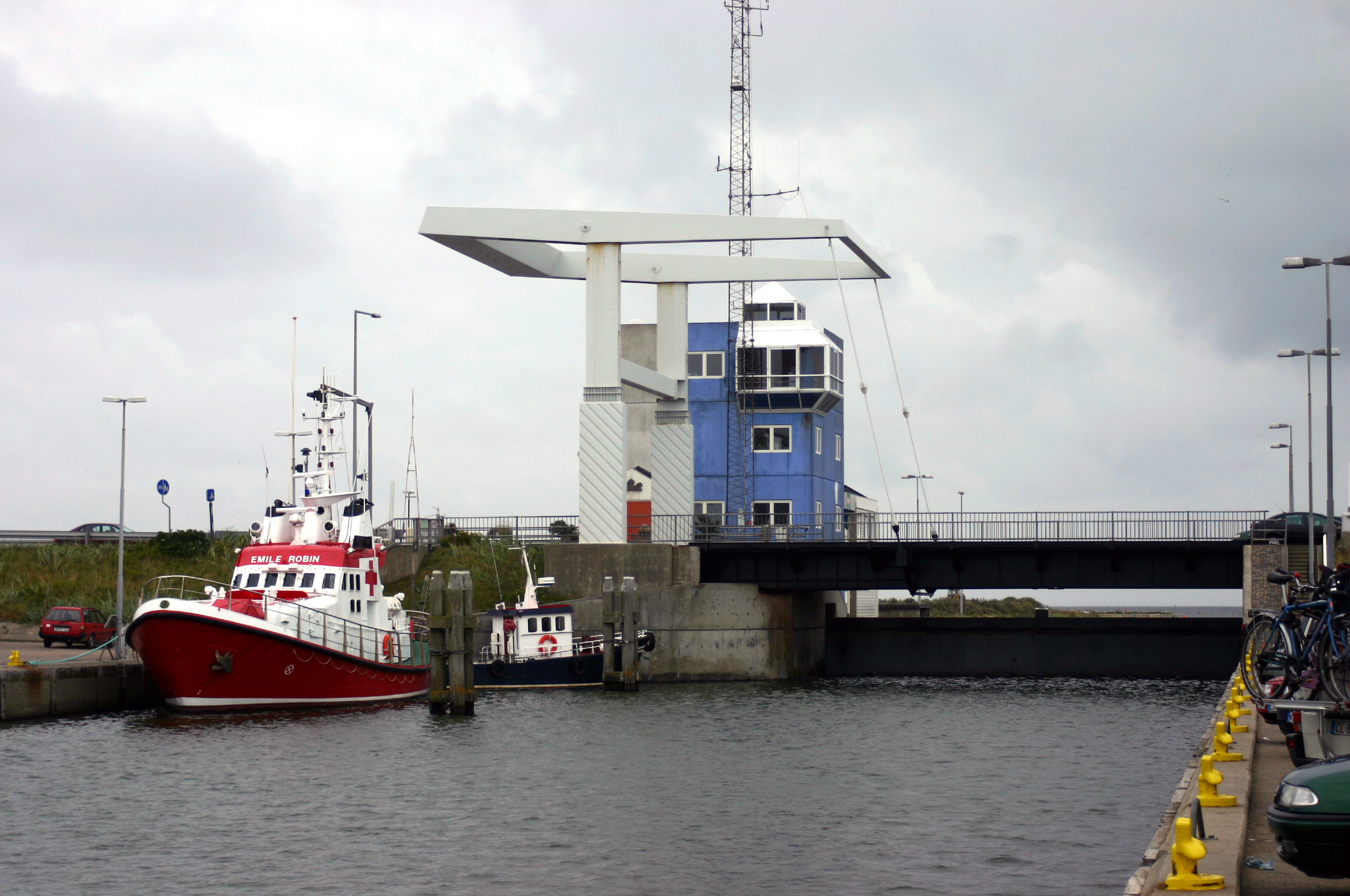
- Lock and bridge in Hvide Sande

- Location in Denmark Hvide Sande (Central Denmark Region)
- Coordinates: 55°59′55″N 8°7′35″E
- Country: Denmark
- Region: Central Denmark
- Municipality: Ringkøbing-Skjern

Area
  - Urban: 2.31 km^{2} (0.89 sq mi)

Population (2026)
  - Urban: 2,762
  - Urban density: 1,200/km^{2} (3,100/sq mi)
  - Gender: 1,384 males and 1,378 females
- Time zone: UTC+1 (CET)
  - Summer (DST): UTC+2 (CEST)
- Postal code: DK-6960 Hvide Sande

Hvide Sande (lit: White Sands) is a small town in the middle of the Holmsland Dunes and placed around the artificial canal which connects Ringkøbing Fjord to the North Sea, in the western part of Central Denmark Region, formerly (until 1 January 2007) Ringkjøbing County, Denmark. The town has a population of 2,762 (1 January 2026) and is the fifth largest fishing port in Denmark.

== Geography ==
The town has, despite its size and placement on the absolute outskirts of Denmark, developed into a very active center for various businesses, first and foremost tourism, fishery, shipyards and more, as well as a harbour for offshore supply boats and services.

== Tourism ==
Tourism is a major contributor to the local economy. Especially German, Danish, Scandinavian and Dutch tourists visit the town and the Holmsland Dunes. They come to the area first and foremost for the quiet and peace along with the possibility to perform a number of outdoor activities in a climate suitable for an active outdoor life. Biking, fishing, wandering and various boardsports are available from a number of vendors.

== Industry ==
The town's biggest employer is Hvide Sande Shipyard, Steel and Service (former Hvide Sande Skibs- & Baadebyggeri) where they build special purpose vessels, crew transfer vessels for the offshore sector and ferries. Vestvaerftet is another shipyard whose specialty is the building of all kinds of fishing vessels.

In 2013 the port of Hvide Sande took a big step towards becoming a supply and support harbour for the offshore industry in the North Sea when the new 800 m long pier south of the harbour was finished thus making it possible for much larger ships to enter the port. In 2016 a new quay was finished in the south part of the outer harbour to accommodate an increased demand from both offshore vessels and freight ships.

As of July 2016, MHI Vestas Offshore Wind chose the port of Hvide Sande as commissioning harbour for the operation of erecting wind turbines at the Horns Rev 3 site 33 km south west of Hvide Sande. MHI Vestas will establish offices for up to 40 persons at the harbour in Hvide Sande.

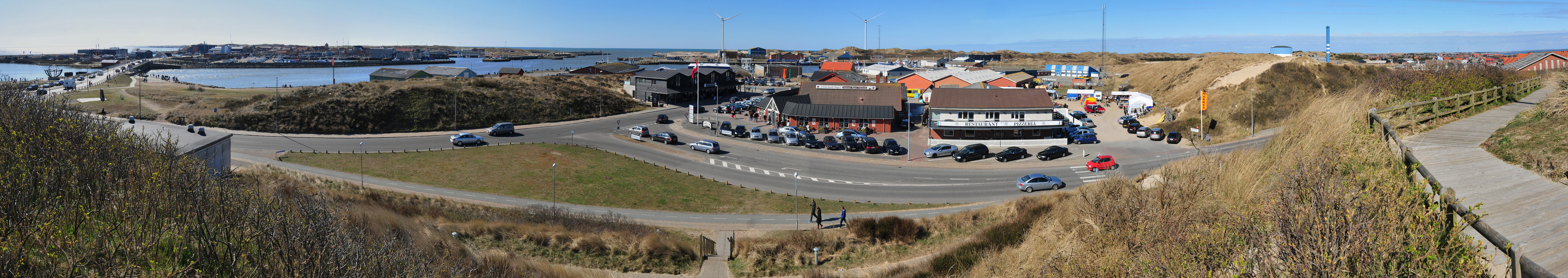
The viewpoint on the hill Troldbjerg allows these views of the harbor and the lock of Hvide Sande in 2012.

== Notable people ==
- Henrik Have (1946 — 2014 in Hvide Sande) a Danish author and artist
- Simon Dahl (born 1991 in Hvide Sande), Danish handball coach

== See also ==
- North Sea Beach Marathon
