= Spjald =

- Village
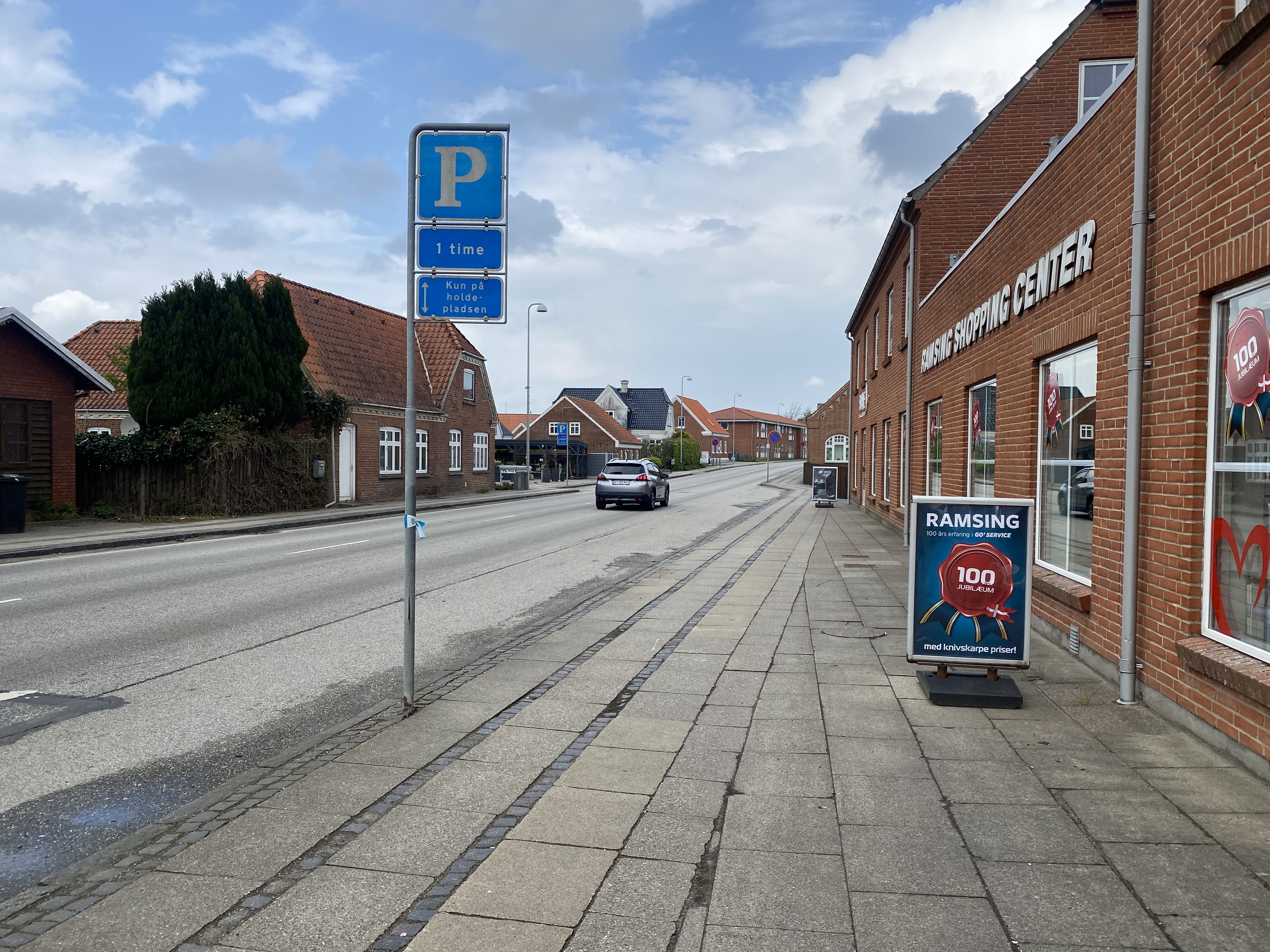
- Main street

- Location in Denmark Spjald (Central Denmark Region)
- Coordinates: 56°07′41″N 8°30′28″E
- Country: Denmark
- Region: Midtjylland
- Municipality: Ringkøbing-Skjern

Area
  - Total: 1.22 km^{2} (0.47 sq mi)
- Elevation: 48 m (157 ft)

Population (1. January 2026)
  - Total: 1,327
  - Density: 1,090/km^{2} (2,820/sq mi)
- Time zone: UTC+1 (CET)
  - Summer (DST): UTC+1 (CEST)
- Postal code: 6971
- Area code: (+45) 9738
- Website: http://spjald.dk/

Spjald is a village (landsby) in Denmark, in the western part of the Jutland Peninsula, Denmark. Spjald with its 1,327 inhabitants (2026) is the seventh largest village in Ringkøbing-Skjern Municipality, the largest municipality in Denmark with 55,405 inhabitants (2026).

Spjald is located on primary route 11 centrally located in the area between Holstebro, Herning, Ringkøbing and Skjern. More precisely, the village is located 28 km south of Holstebro, 21 km north of Skjern and 20 km northeast of Ringkøbing.

The village's inhabitants are called Spjald-borgere (English: Citizens of Spjald). In 2009, Spjald was named "Village of the Year" by the Central Denmark Region

== Etymology ==
The name Spjald refers to the piece of land on which the city is situated on. Previously, the land was a field owned by the local manor, Brejninggaard. The name of the patch of field was Spjald.

== History ==
In earlier times, Spjald was part of the Brejningaard estate. In the 19th century, there were only three farms where Spjald is now: Søndergaard and Nørre Søndergaard west of the road and Spjald east of the road.

In 1888, a number of farmers from the parishes of Brejning, Hover and Nørre Omme together with the landowner at Brejninggaard, H.G. Koefoed, decided to form the cooperative dairy Brejning Mejeri. As early as 1899, Nørre Omme parish left the cooperative dairy, henceforth known as Brejning-Hover Andelsmejeri and later Brejning-Muldbjerg Andelsmejeri. The dairy operated until 1988, when it was closed shortly before its 100th anniversary. In 2019, the dairy was demolished and a memorial stone now stands in its place.

The dairy formed the basis for a local community that was named Brejning Mejeriby. The name changed to Spjald Stationsby in 1911 with the arrival of the railway and later that year it was simply called Spjald.

== Geography and topography ==
=== Geographical location ===
Geographically, Spjald is located in the middle of West Jutland, close to the town of Videbæk (8 km). 21 km to the south lies the town of Skjern and just 20 km to the west, the town of Ringkøbing. To the north it is 28 km to the town of Holstebro and in an easterly direction 34 km to Herning. From the latter two towns, the Danish motorway network can be reached. Spjald is traversed by primary route 11, which starts in Sæd at the German border and ends in Aalborg. In Spjald, the primary route is called "Hovedgaden" (English: Main Street).

=== Topography ===
Spjald is located on a so-called hill island called Skovbjerg Bakkeø, which is Denmark's largest with an area of approximately 1,5-1,600 km^{2}. The area consists of glacier and meltwater discharges from the penultimate place (Saale). Bakkeøen is surrounded by plains from the last ice age (Weichsel). The existing soil around Spjald is mostly sandy moraine. This is the reason why the area is largely characterized by plantations and heath. One of the highest points on the hill island is a little north of Spjald. The point is called Trehøje. It is located in the protected heath Tiphede, and has a height of 102 meters above sea level.

Spjald is surrounded by Hover river in the western direction and Rand stream, which surrounds it to the north and east.

=== Climate ===
Spjald has a temperate oceanic climate (Köppen classification). West Jutland is generally characterized by a higher amount of precipitation and fewer hours of sunshine than the rest of the country due to its location. When the wind blows from the west, it brings in air from the North Sea. The table below shows the climate for Ringkøbing-Skjern municipality in the period of 2011–2023. The figures are taken from DMI's (Denmark's Metrological Institute) weather archive.

Ringkøbing-Skjern Municipality (2011–2023)
Average Temperature	Low (abs.)	Avg. Low	Avg. High	High (abs.)	Precipitation	Total Sunshine	Avg. Wind Speed
°C					mm	Hours	m/s
8,9	-18,1	-11,4	29,98	35,6	875,18	1650	4,89
Source: DMI - Denmark's Metrological Institute: https://www.dmi.dk/vejrarkiv/

The lowest temperature measured in the period 2011-2023 was -18.1 degrees Celsius with an average lowest temperature of -11.4 degrees Celsius. For the country as a whole, this was -23.1 degrees Celsius and 14.38 degrees Celsius, respectively. Ringkøbing-Skjern municipality, and with it Spjald, does not get as cold as the rest of the country.

Looking at the other end of the scale, the highest temperature during the period was 35.6 degrees Celsius with an average highest temperature of 29.98 degrees Celsius. For the country as a whole, this was 35.9 degrees Celsius and 29.62 degrees Celsius. In general, the highest temperature is thus slightly lower in Ringkøbing-Skjern municipality than in the rest of the country.

In terms of rainfall, Ringkøbing-Skjern municipality is at the high end with an average of 876.18 millimeters of rainfall in the period 2011–2023. The country as a whole received an average of 711.88 millimeters of rainfall, representing a difference of 163.3 millimeters.

== Demography and demographic development ==
=== Population and population composition ===
With a population of 1,351, Spjald was the sixth largest urban area in Ringkøbing-Skjern Municipality in 2022. The village is closely followed by Lem, which in the same year had a population of 1,322. By comparison, Hvide Sande was the fifth largest urban area in the municipality with a population in 2022 of 2,876. In the past decade, the population in Spjald has increased by 55 people from 1,294 inhabitants in 2010 to 1,351 inhabitants in 2022, a growth of just over four percent. The development in the population during the period can be seen in the table below.

Spjald: Historical development of the population 2010–2022
2010	2011	2012	2013	2014	2015	2016	2017	2018	2019	2020	2021	2022
1,294	1,266	1,271	1,309	1,263	1,281	1,304	1,279	1,330	1,356	1,344	1,353	1,351

Of the 1,351 people who could call themselves Spjaldborgere in 2022, 50.6 percent were women (683 people) and 49.4 percent were men (668 people). If you look at the age distribution of the inhabitants in 2022, it was evenly spread across the age groups. The grouping 0–19 years consisted of 295 people (21.8%); 20–39 years consisted of 276 people (20.4%); 40–59 years consisted of 329 persons (24.4%), and the grouping 60+ years consisted of 451 persons (33.4%).

A single citizen in Spjald could boast of being more than 100 years old in 2022.

=== Population projection ===
In recent years, Spjald has experienced further, albeit weak, growth in the population. The increase should be seen in the light of the fact that the population in the municipality has been decreasing during the period. The municipality expects the number of inhabitants in Spjald to increase to 1,500 in 2028.

Ringkøbing-Skjern Municipality: Historical development of the population 2010–2020
2010	2011	2012	2013	2014	2015	2016	2017	2018	2019	2020	2021	2022
58,439	58,068	57,892	57,529	57,093	57,042	57,139	57,022	57,005	56,930	56,594	56,182	56,203

The population projections, which the municipality has prepared in collaboration with the Danish company COWI, shows that the municipality expects to lose a further 825 citizens towards 2032.

=== Historical development of the population ===
In 1911 Spjald housed 230 inhabitants, growing to 281 inhabitants in 1916, spread over 50 houses and farms. The village continued its development, albeit slowly, until and after the World War. It was only in the period after 1960 and onwards, when the village, much like the rest of the country, experienced a significant increase in population. The population development from 1921 until 1981 can be seen in the table below.

Spjald: Historical development of the population 1911–1981
1911	1916	1921	1925	1930	1935	1940	1945	1950	1955	1960	1965	1970	1976	1979	1981
230	281	291	364	375	410	427	474	506	528	549	697	847	1,139	1,194	1,253

== Notable residents ==
- Jesper Juelsgård (born 1989, in Spjald) a Danish professional footballer
