= Videbæk =

- Town
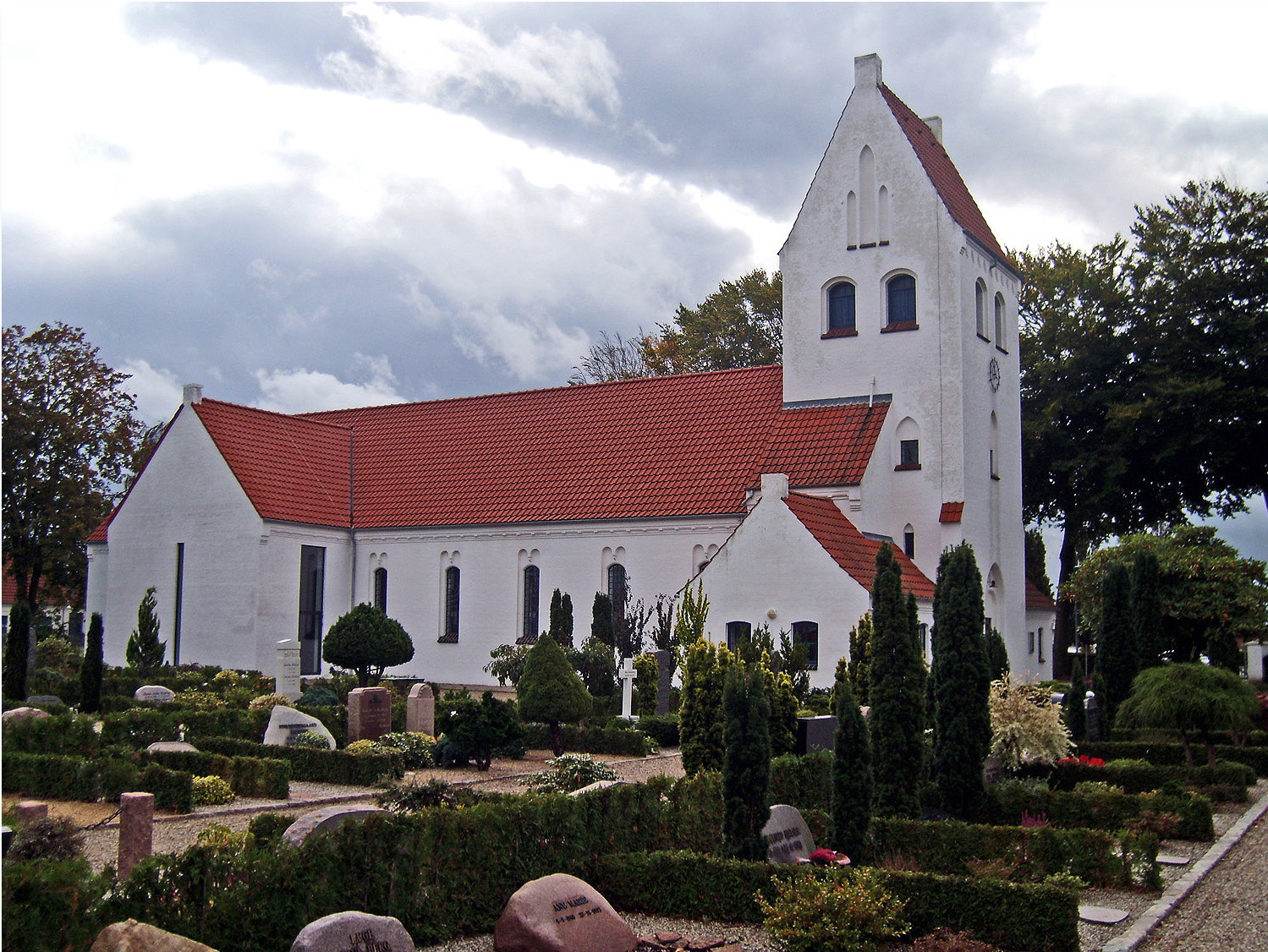
- Videbæk Church

- Location in Denmark Videbæk (Central Denmark Region)
- Coordinates: 56°5′35″N 8°37′57″E
- Country: Denmark
- Region: Region Midtjylland
- Municipality: Ringkøbing-Skjern

Area
  - Urban: 3.6 km^{2} (1.4 sq mi)

Population (2026)
  - Urban: 4,299
  - Urban density: 1,200/km^{2} (3,100/sq mi)
  - Gender: 2,106 males and 2,193 females
- Time zone: UTC+1 (CET)
  - Summer (DST): UTC+2 (CEST)
- Postal code: DK-6920 Videbæk

Videbæk is a town, with a population of 4,299 (1 January 2026), located in Ringkøbing-Skjern Municipality, Region Midtjylland, at the road between Ringkøbing and Herning. It was the municipal seat of the former Videbæk Municipality.

Videbæk is known for Per Arnoldi's large corten steel sculpture in the shape of a V, known as "The V", which is found at a roundabout at the entrance to the town. The sculpture was dedicated on 15 August 1996.

== Videbæk Church ==
Videbæk Church dated back to 1914 is located in the town.

== Constructions ==
The Videbæk Transmitter is one of the tallest masts in Denmark.

== Attractions ==
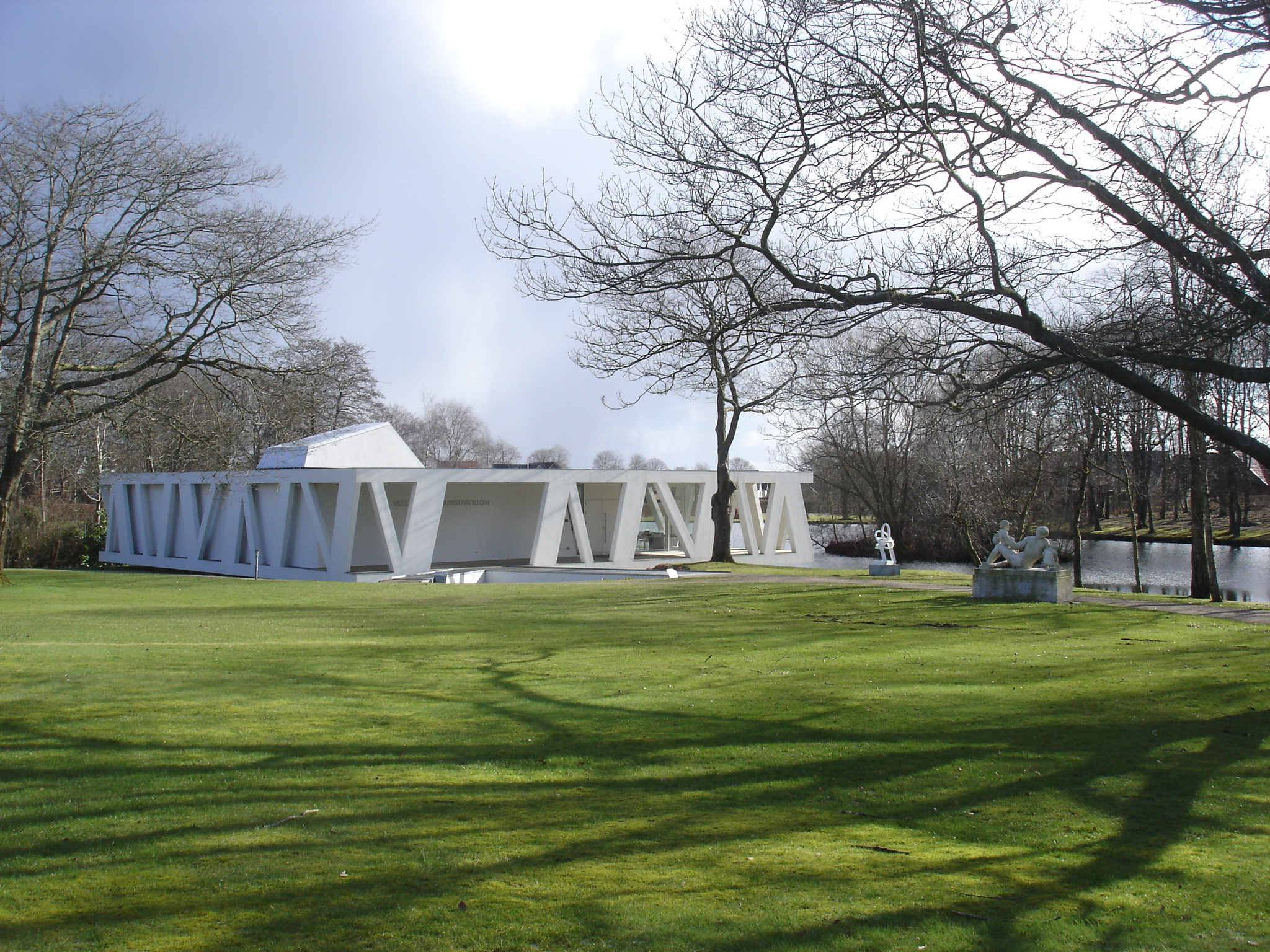
Vestjyllands Kunstpavillon

The art pavilion Vestjyllands Kunstpavillon (VK) opened in 2017, designed by Henning Larsen Architects. It is situated in a small park and exhibits changing artists and hosts concerts, lectures and cultural events. Architect Henning Larsen grew up around Videbæk and the art pavilion has some of his artwork on permanent display. There is also a permanent museum dedicated to Danish artist Arne Haugen Sørensen.

The local museum (Videbæk Egnsmuseum) is located 5 km east of Videbæk near the village of Vorgod.

== Videbæk Municipality ==
The former Videbæk Municipality covered an area of 289 km^{2}, and had a total population of 12,140 (2005). Its last mayor was Torben Nørregaard, a member of the Venstre (Liberal party) political party.

=== Creation ===
Videbæk Municipality was created in 1970 due to a kommunalreform ("Municipality Reform") that combined a number of existing parishes:

- Brejning Parish
- Brejning Parish
- Nørre Vium Parish
- Troldhede Parish
- Videbæk Parish
- Vorgod Parish.

=== Cessation ===
On 1 January 2007 Videbæk municipality ceased to exist due to Kommunalreformen ("The Municipality Reform" of 2007). It was merged with Egvad, Holmsland, Ringkøbing, and Skjern municipalities to form the new Ringkøbing-Skjern Municipality. This created a municipality with an area of 1,485 km^{2} and a total population of 57,818 (2005).

=== Description ===
There is much agriculture in the former municipality, as well as some large industry. Denmark's largest dairy company, Arla Foods (North Vium facility), is located in the former municipality.

Videbæk municipality was recognised as the Year's Environment Municipality (Årets Miljøkommunne) in 1991, the Year's Entrepreneurial Municipality (Årets Iværksætterkommune) in 1992, and one of four Green City Municipalities in 1993–1994.

== Notable people ==
- Jens Lund (1873 in Videbæk - 1946) a Danish sculptor
- Henning Larsen (1925-2013), architect. He grew up around Videbæk
- Jens Berthel Askou (born 1982 in Videbæk) a Danish football coach and former professional footballer
- Ida (born 1994 in Videbæk) stage name of Ida Østergaard Madsen, a Danish singer who won the Danish X Factor
- Kim Astrup (born 1992) a Danish badminton player who won the 2018 European Championships, 2023 European Games, and a silver medal at the BWF World Championships
- Litten Hansen (born 1944) a Danish former actress, activist and politician for the Left Socialists
