= Ringkøbing-Skjern Municipality =

Ringkøbing-Skjern Municipality Ringkøbing-Skjern Kommune (Danish)
- Municipality
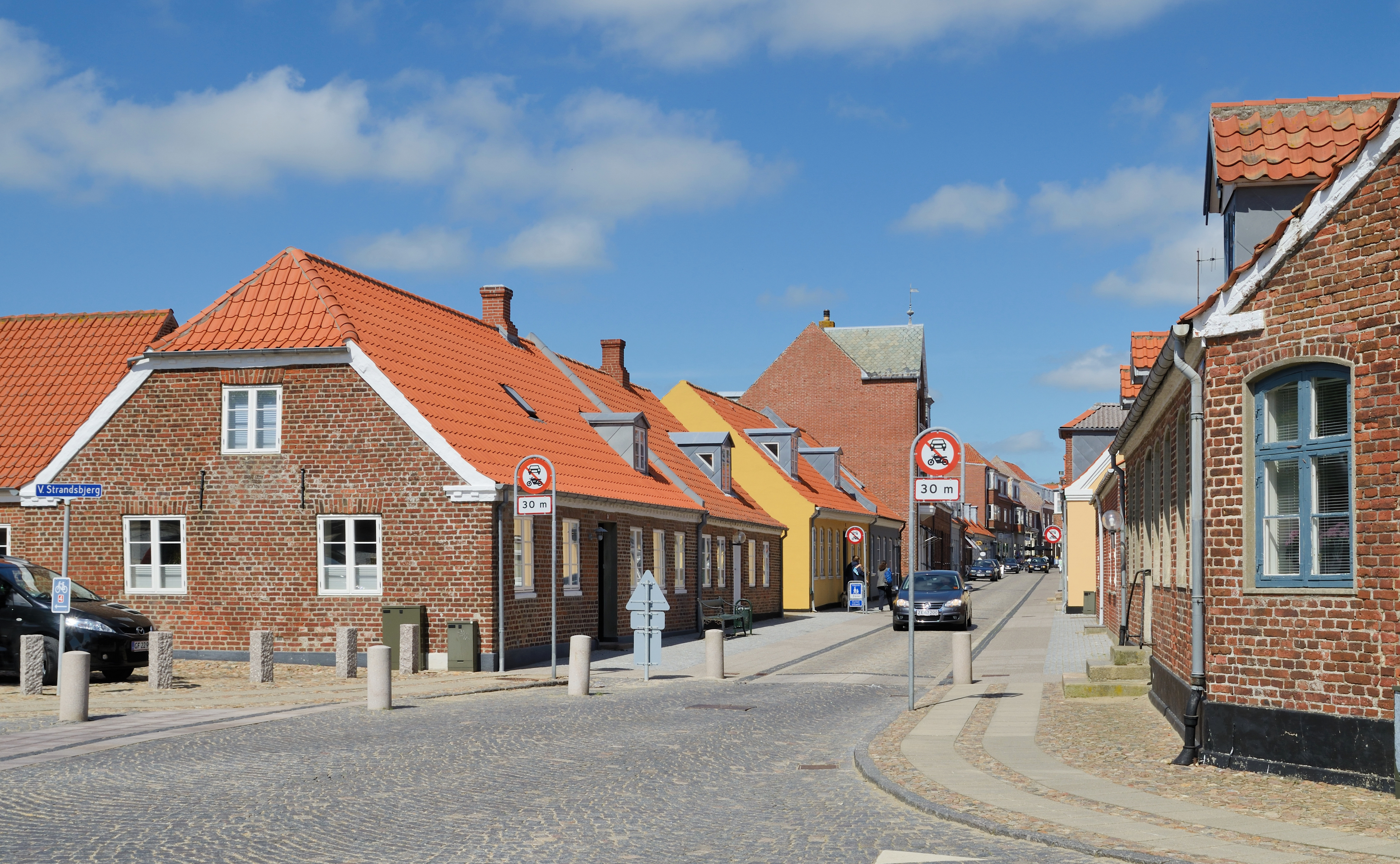
- Ringkøbing

- Coat of arms

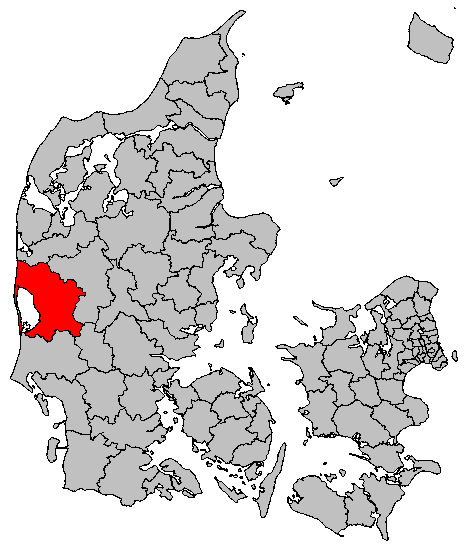
- Location in Denmark
- Coordinates: 56°00′36″N 8°23′48″E
- Country: Denmark
- Region: Central Jutland
- Established: 1 January 2007

Government
  - Mayor: Lone Andersen (V)

Area
  - Total: 1,485 km^{2} (573 sq mi)

Population (1 January 2026)
  - Total: 55,405
  - Density: 37.31/km^{2} (96.63/sq mi)
- Time zone: UTC+1 (CET)
  - Summer (DST): UTC+2 (CEST)
- Postal code: 6950
- Website: www.rksk.dk

Ringkøbing-Skjern Municipality (Danish: Ringkøbing-Skjern Kommune) is a municipality in western Denmark. Formed on 1 January 2007 during the nationwide 2007 administrative reform, it comprises the former municipalities of Egvad, Holmsland, Ringkøbing, Skjern and Videbæk. Covering 1,494.56 square kilometres (577.05 sq mi), it is the largest municipality in Denmark by area. The municipality has a population of 55,405 (1 January 2026) and is part of the Central Denmark Region (Region Midtjylland). Its mayor since 2025 is Lennart Qvist of the Conservative People's Party (C).

The Church of Denmark comprises 46 parishes within the municipality.

== Locations ==
Ringkøbing	9,830
Skjern	7,737
Videbæk	4,351
Tarm	4,122
Hvide Sande	2,780
Lem	1,358
Spjald	1,342
Vorgod-Barde	1,023
Borris	858

== Politics ==
=== Municipal council ===
Ringkøbing-Skjern's municipal council consists of 29 members, elected every four years.

Below are the municipal councils elected since the Municipal Reform of 2007.

Election	Party										Total seats	Turnout	Elected mayor
Election	A	C	D	F	I	J	K	O	V	Æ	Total seats	Turnout	Elected mayor
2005	5	2		1			3	1	17		29	74.3%	Torben Nørregaard (V)
2009	5	1		3			2	2	16		29	70.3%	Iver Enevoldsen (V)
2013	6			3		1	3	2	14		29	76.0%	Iver Enevoldsen (V)
2017	6			3		1	6	2	11		29	74.8%	Hans Østergaard (V)
2021	4	3	1	3			6	1	11		29	70.1%	Hans Østergaard (V)
2025	3	1		3	1		5	1	8	7	29	72.2%	Lone Andersen (V)
Data from Kmdvalg.dk 2005, 2009, 2013, 2017 and 2021. Data from valg.dk 2025

== See also ==
- Hoven, Denmark
