= Hee railway station =

Railway station in West Jutland, Denmark

Hee
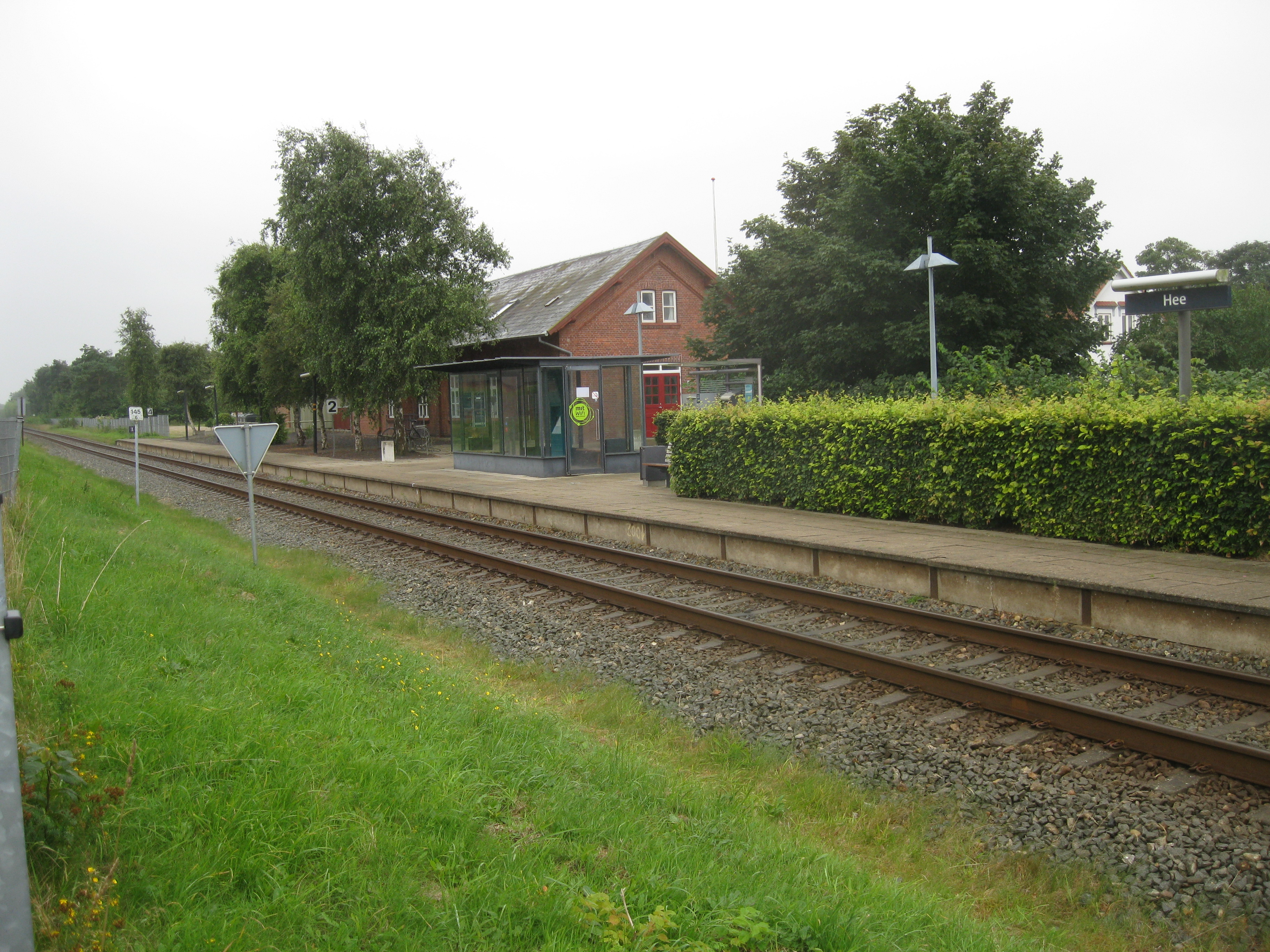
- Hee station in 2016

General information
- Location: Ringgaden 3 Hee, 6950 Ringkøbing; Ringkøbing-Skjern Municipality; Denmark
- Coordinates: 56°8′37″N 8°17′12″E
- Elevation: 6.0 metres (19.7 ft)
- Owner: DSB (station infrastructure); Banedanmark (rail infrastructure)
- Line: Esbjerg-Struer railway line
- Platforms: 1
- Tracks: 1
- Train operators: Midtjyske Jernbaner

History
- Opened: 31 March 1875

Services
Preceding station	Midtjyske Jernbaner	Following station
Ringkøbing towards Skjern	Skjern–Holstebro Regional train	Tim towards Holstebro
Location

Hee railway station is a railway station serving the small railway town of Hee in West Jutland, Denmark.

Hee station is located on the Esbjerg–Struer railway line from Esbjerg to Struer. The station opened in 1875. It offers regional rail services to Holstebro and Skjern, operated by the railway company Midtjyske Jernbaner.

== History ==
The station opened on 31 March 1875 as a railway halt on the section from Holstebro to Ringkøbing of the new Esbjerg–Struer railway line opened. A station building was built in 1902. The station has been unstaffed since 1966.

== Services ==
The station offers direct regional rail services to Skjern and Holstebro, operated by the regional railway company Midtjyske Jernbaner.

== See also ==
- List of railway stations in Denmark
- Rail transport in Denmark
