= Lem railway station =

Railway station in West Jutland, Denmark

Lem
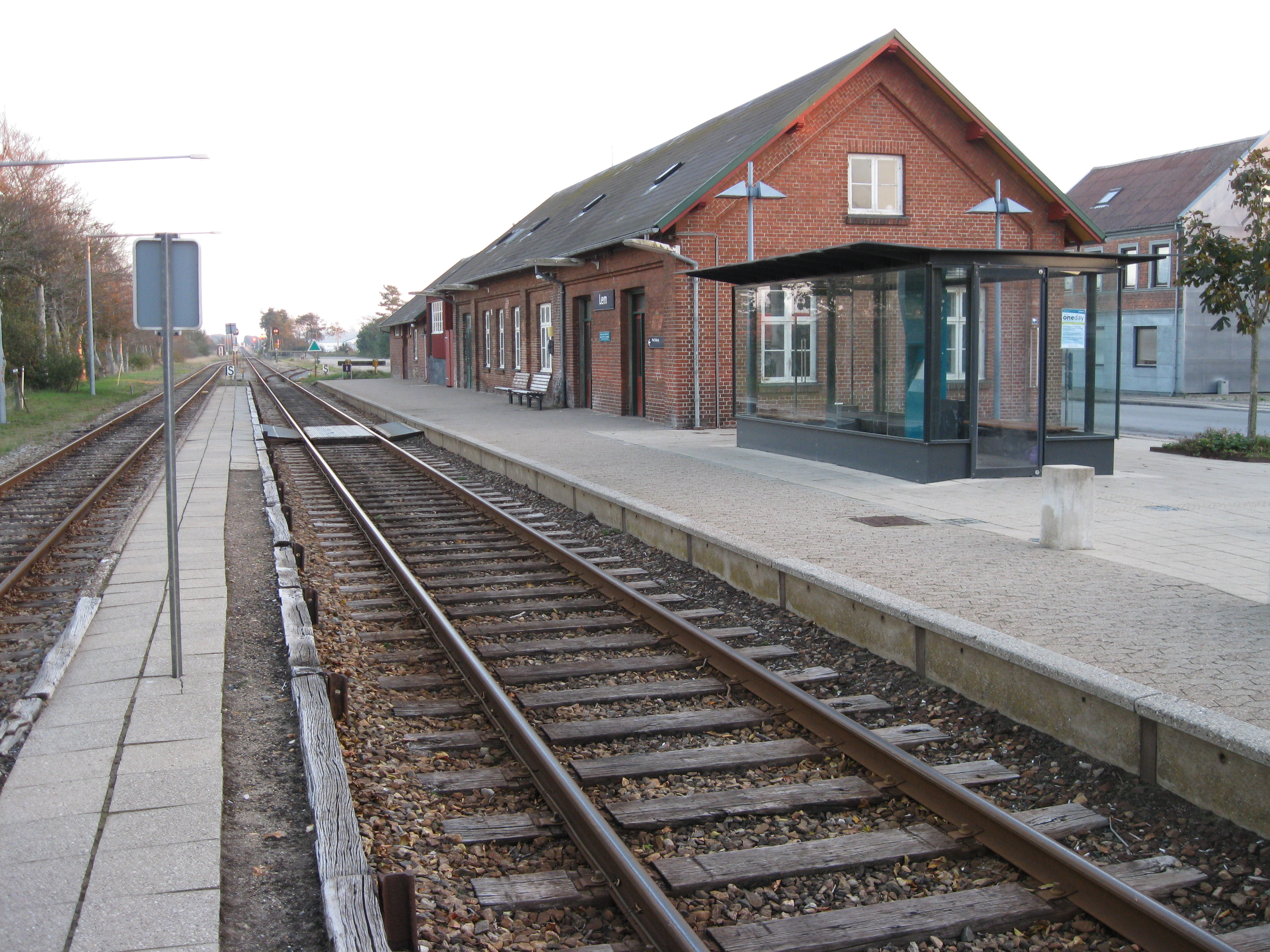
- Lem station in 2010

General information
- Location: Jernbanegade 3; 6940 Lem; Ringkøbing-Skjern Municipality; Denmark
- Coordinates: 56°01′30″N 8°23′09″E
- Elevation: 8.9 metres (29 ft)
- Owner: DSB (station infrastructure); Banedanmark (rail infrastructure)
- Line: Esbjerg–Struer railway line
- Platforms: 2
- Tracks: 2
- Train operators: Midtjyske Jernbaner

History
- Opened: 8 August 1875

Services
Preceding station	Midtjyske Jernbaner	Following station
Skjern Terminus	Skjern–Holstebro Regional train	Ringkøbing towards Holstebro
Location

Lem railway station is a railway station serving the railway town of Lem in West Jutland, Denmark.

Lem station is located on the Esbjerg–Struer railway line from Esbjerg to Struer. The station opened in 1875. It offers regional rail services to Holstebro and Skjern, operated by the railway company Midtjyske Jernbaner.

== History ==
The station opened on 8 August 1875 as the section from Varde to Ringkøbing of the new Esbjerg–Struer railway line opened. It has been unstaffed since 1970.

== Architecture ==
The station building from 1875 was designed by the Danish architect Niels Peder Christian Holsøe (1826–1895), known for the numerous railway stations he designed across Denmark in his capacity of head architect of the Danish State Railways.

== Services ==
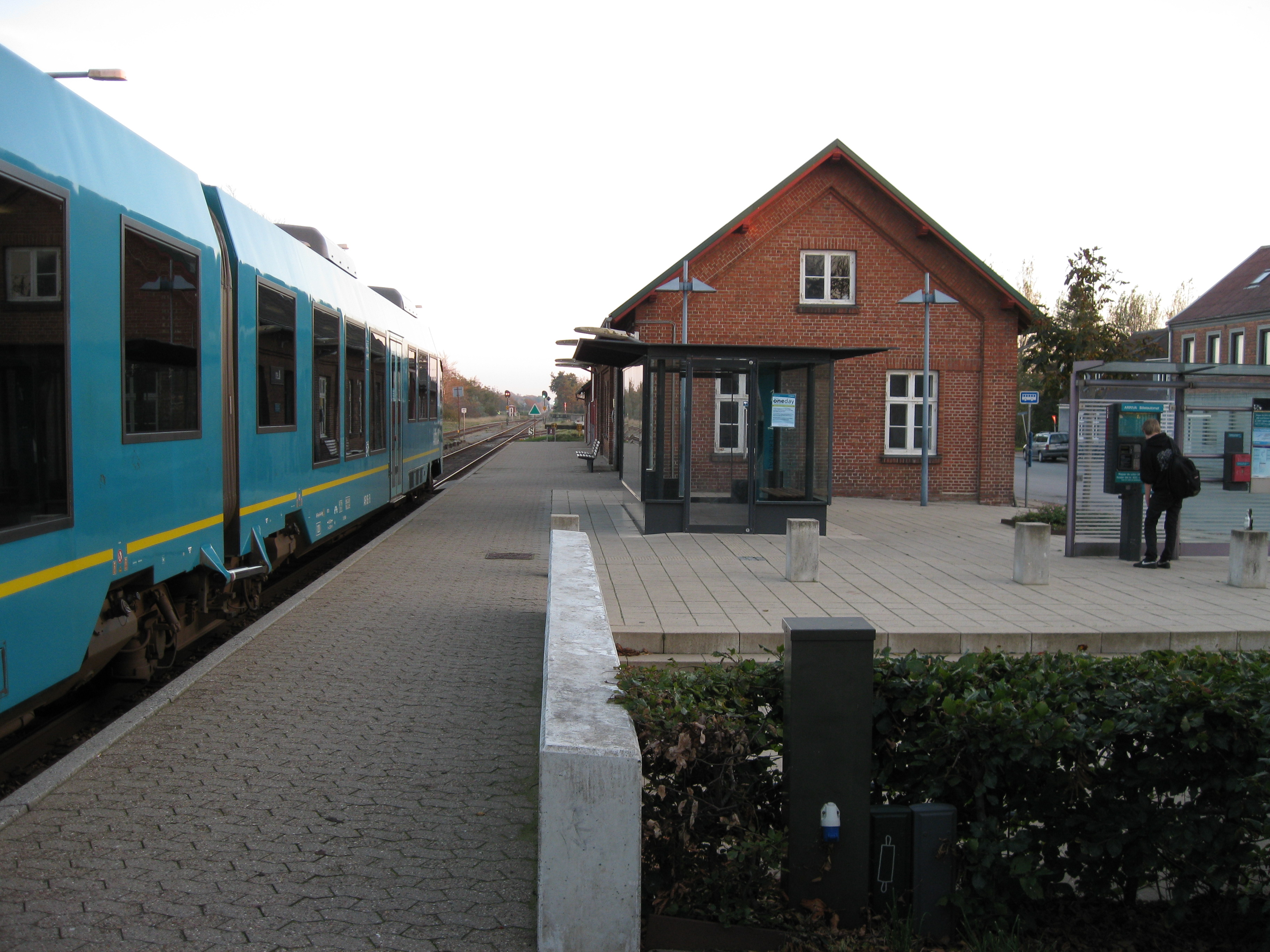
Train calling at Lem station in 2010.

The station offers direct regional rail services to Skjern and Holstebro, operated by the regional railway company Midtjyske Jernbaner.

== See also ==
- List of railway stations in Denmark
- Rail transport in Denmark
