= Ringkøbing railway station =

Railway station in West Jutland, Denmark

Ringkøbing Station Ringkøbing Banegård
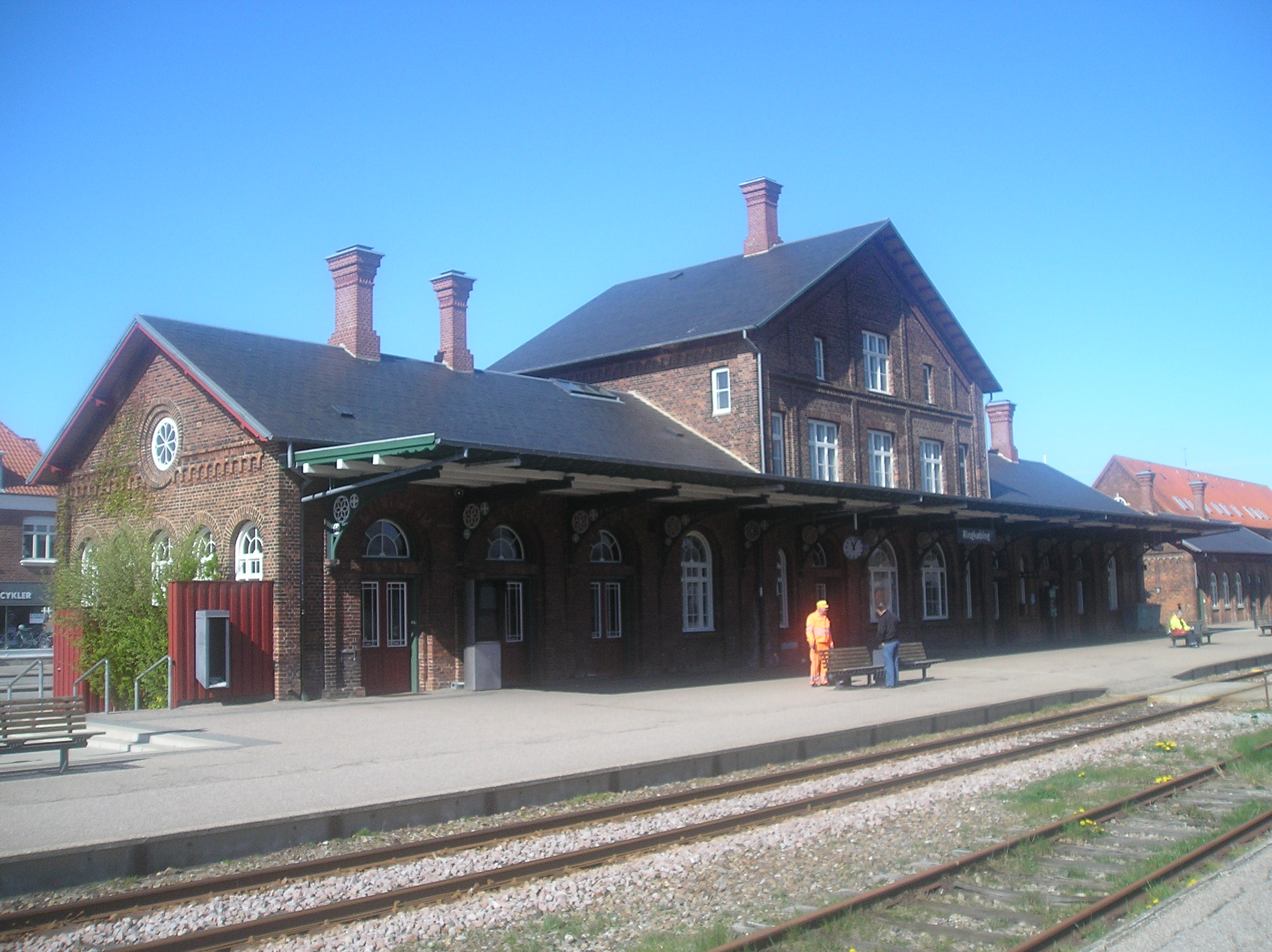
- Ringkøbing station in 2009

General information
- Location: Nørredige 3A; 6950 Ringkøbing; Ringkøbing-Skjern Municipality; Denmark
- Coordinates: 56°05′34″N 8°15′02″E
- Elevation: 3.1 metres (10 ft)
- System: Railway station
- Owner: DSB (station infrastructure); Banedanmark (rail infrastructure)
- Lines: Esbjerg–Struer; Ringkøbing–Ørnhøj–Holstebro (closed 1961)
- Platforms: 2
- Tracks: 3
- Train operators: Midtjyske Jernbaner

Construction
- Architect: Niels Peder Christian Holsøe

History
- Opened: 31 March 1875

Services
Preceding station	Midtjyske Jernbaner	Following station
Lem towards Skjern	Skjern–Holstebro Regional train	Hee towards Holstebro
Location
- Location within Denmark Location within Central Denmark Region

Ringkøbing railway station (Danish: Ringkøbing Station or Ringkøbing Banegård) is a railway station serving the market town of Ringkøbing in West Jutland, Denmark. It is located in central Ringkøbing, to the northeast of the town centre, and immediately adjacent to the Ringkøbing bus station.

Ringkøbing station is located on the Esbjerg–Struer railway line from Esbjerg to Struer. The station opened in 1875. It offers regional rail services to Holstebro and Skjern, operated by the railway company Midtjyske Jernbaner.

== History ==
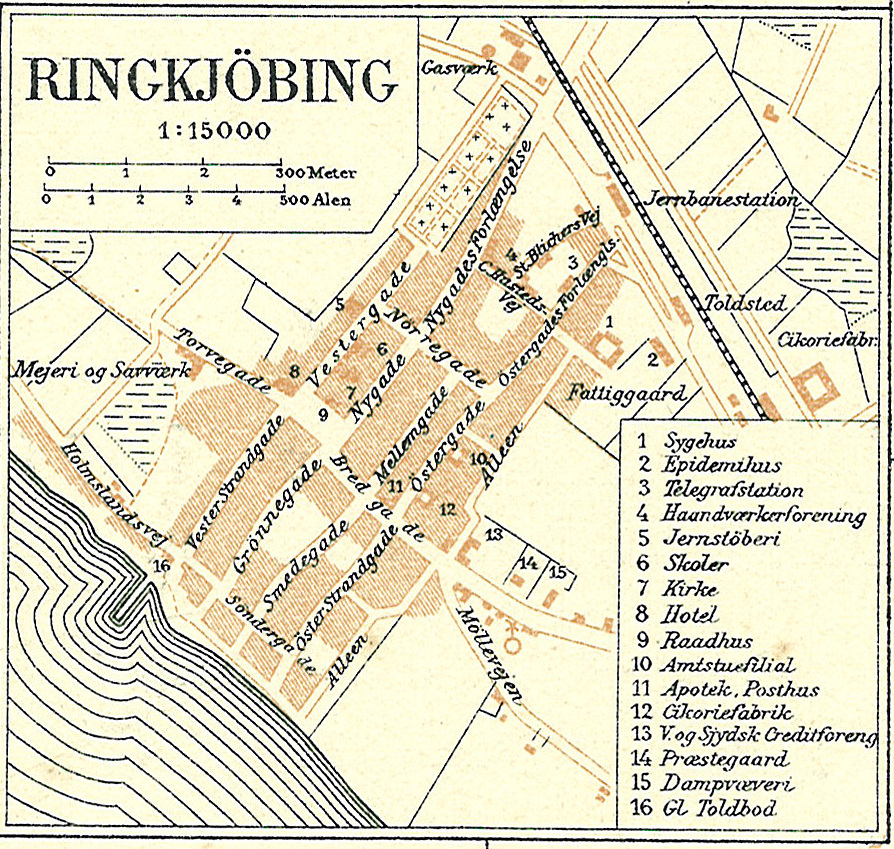
Map of Ringkøbing c. 1900

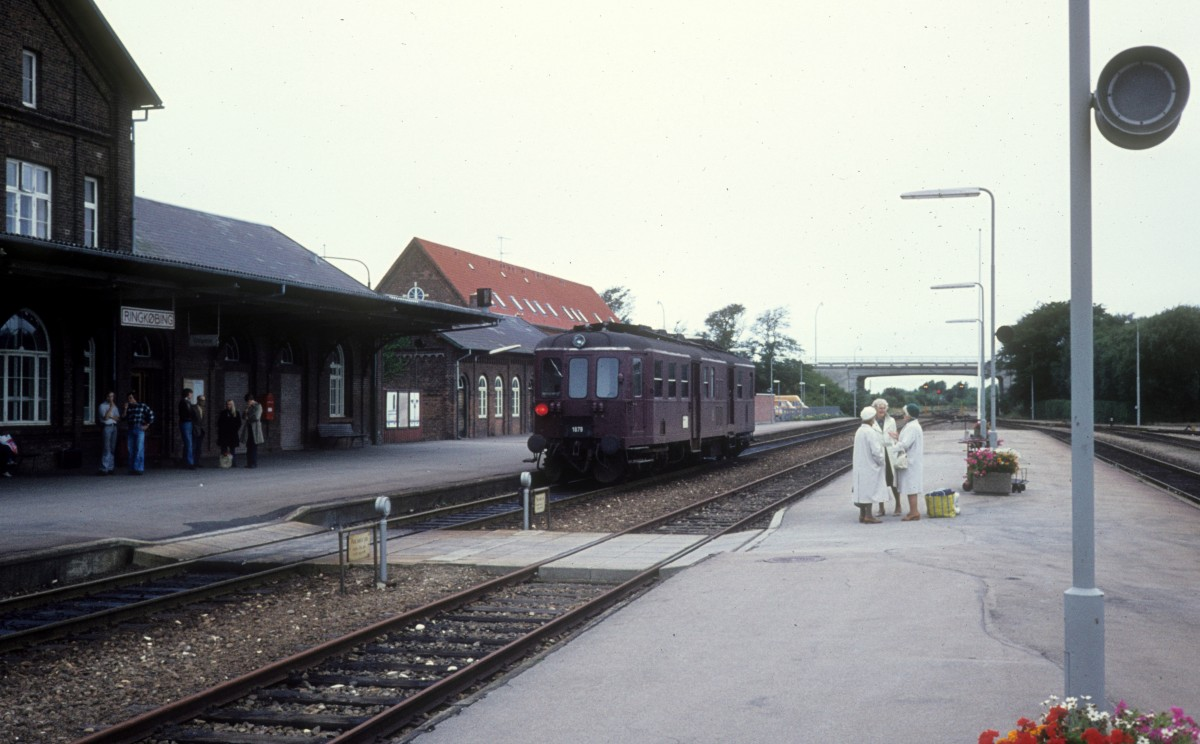
DSB MO railcar at Ringkøbing station in 1977

The station opened on 31 March 1875 as the section from Holstebro to Ringkøbing of the new Esbjerg–Struer railway line opened. Later the same year, on 8 August, the section from Varde to Ringkøbing also opened. The West Jutland longitudinal railway line was thus completed, and connected Ringkøbing to the rest of Denmark's railway lines at both ends.

On 15 November 1911 Ringkøbing station also became the southern terminus of the new Ringkøbing–Ørnhøj railway line, which connected Ringkøbing with the village of Ørnhøj. This railway line was prolonged to Holstebro on 28 August 1925. The Ringkøbing–Ørnhøj–Holstebro railway line closed on 31 March 1961.

Previously, an industrial siding connected Ringkøbing station with the harbour of Ringkøbing.

== Architecture ==
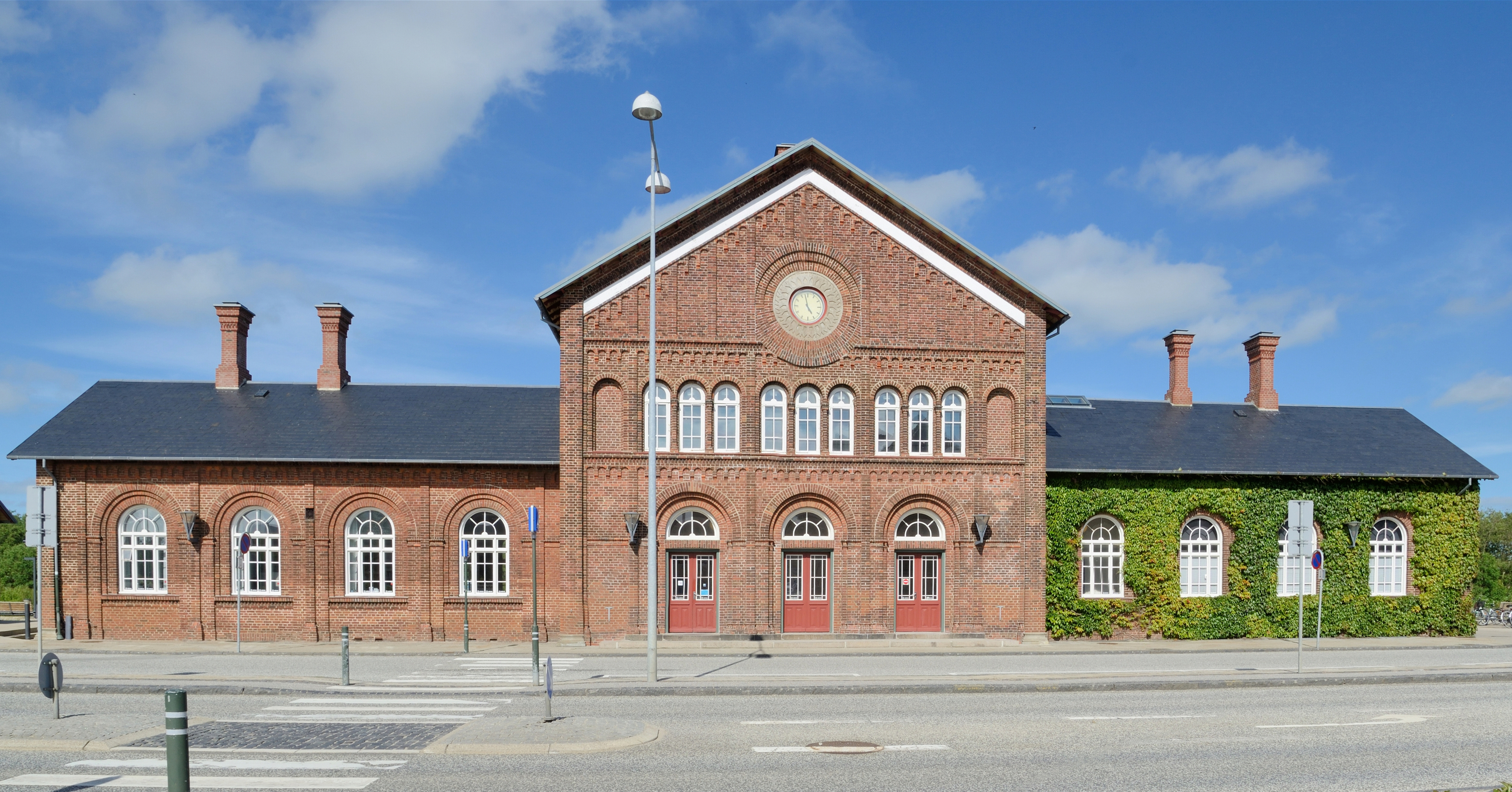
Street facade of Ringkøbing station in 2012

The still existing station building from 1875 was built to designs by the Danish architect Niels Peder Christian Holsøe (1826–1895), known for the numerous railway stations he designed across Denmark in his capacity of head architect of the Danish State Railways.

== Services ==
The station offers direct regional rail services to Skjern and Holstebro, operated by the regional railway company Midtjyske Jernbaner.

== See also ==
- List of railway stations in Denmark
- Rail transport in Denmark
