= Hjerm railway station =

Railway station in Struer Municipality, Denmark

Hjerm
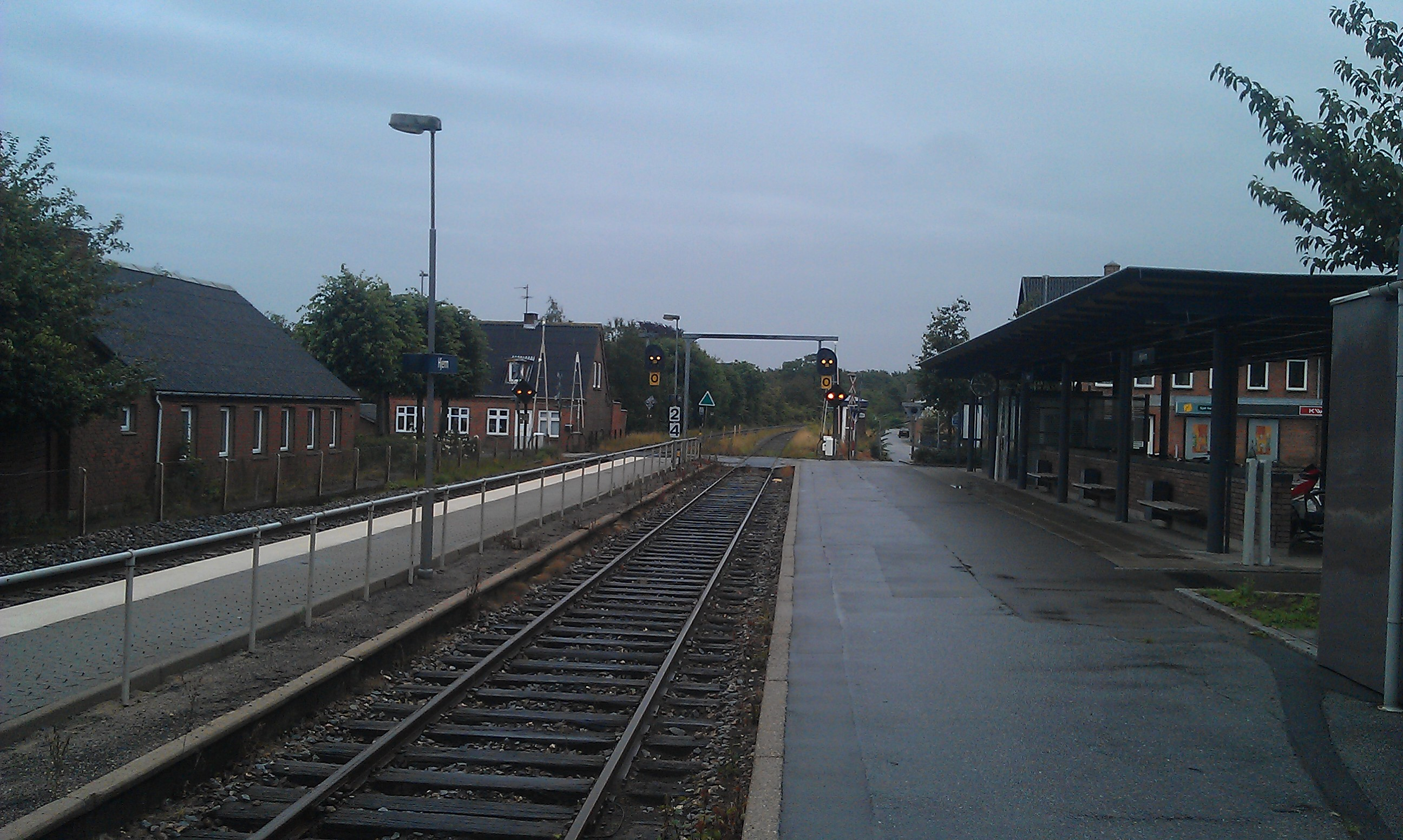
- Hjerm station in August 2011

General information
- Location: Jernbanegade 2; 7560 Hjerm; Struer Municipality; Denmark
- Coordinates: 56°26′20″N 8°38′23″E
- Elevation: 29.5 metres (97 ft)
- Owner: DSB (station infrastructure); Banedanmark (rail infrastructure)
- Line: Esbjerg–Struer
- Platforms: 2
- Tracks: 2
- Train operators: DSB

Other information
- Website: Official website

History
- Opened: 1868

Services
Preceding station	DSB	Following station
Holstebro towards Copenhagen Airport	Copenhagen-Herning-Struer InterCityLyn	Struer Terminus
Preceding station	DSB Vores Tog	Following station
Holstebro towards Vejle	Vejle–Struer Regional train	Struer Terminus
Holstebro towards Skjern	Skjern–Struer Regional train	Struer Terminus
Location

Hjerm station is a railway station serving the small railway town of Hjerm in West Jutland, Denmark.

Hjerm station is located on the Esbjerg–Struer railway line. The station was opened in 1868 two years after the opening of the Struer–Holstebro section of the Esbjerg–Struer line in 1866. It offers direct InterCityLyn services to Copenhagen as well as regional train services to Fredericia, Aarhus and Struer, all operated by the national railway company DSB.

== See also ==
- List of railway stations in Denmark
- Rail transport in Denmark
