= Lem, Denmark =

Lem
- Town
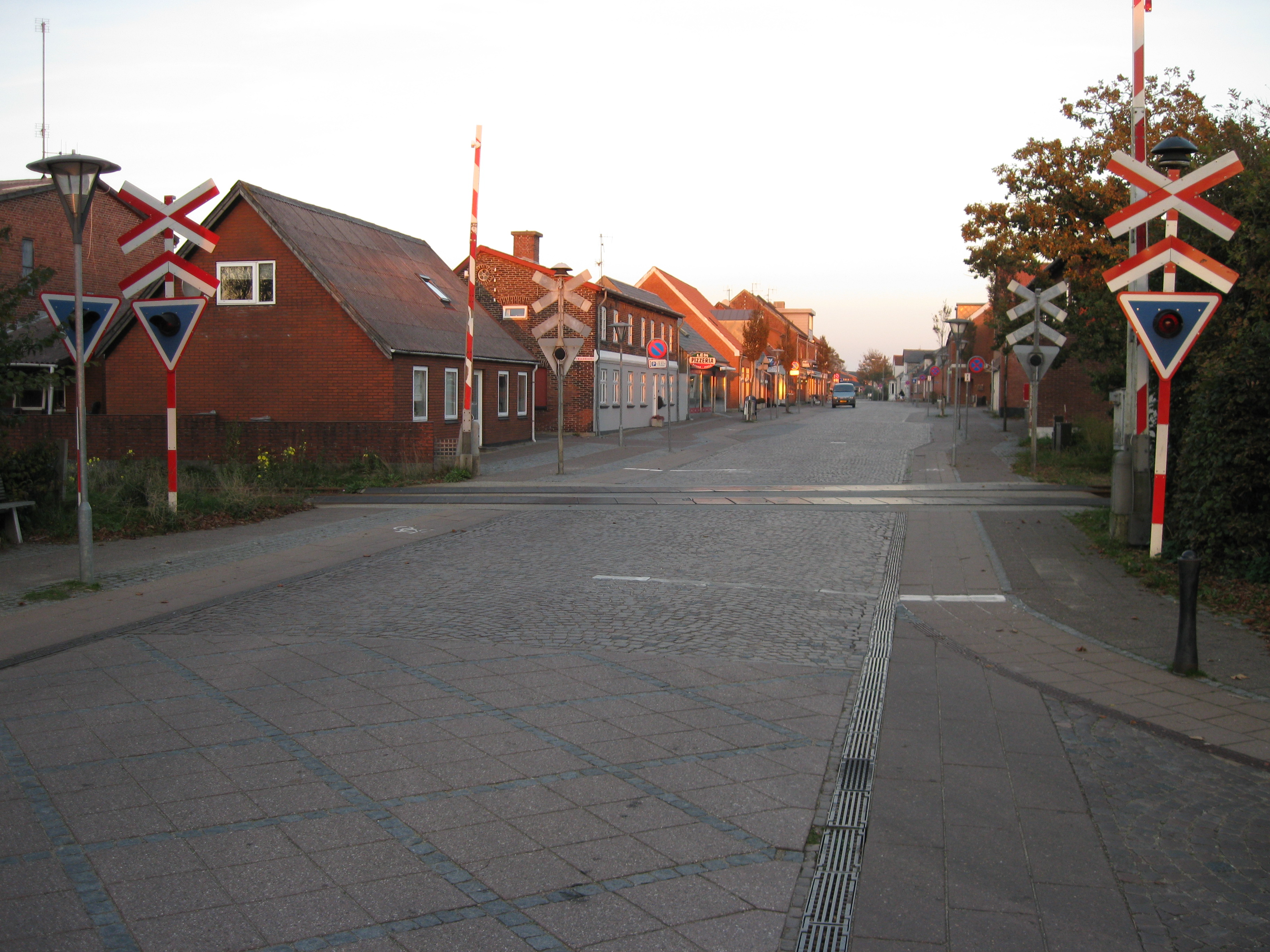
- Lem in 2010

- Location in Denmark Lem (Central Denmark Region)
- Coordinates: 56°1′29″N 8°23′9″E
- Country: Denmark
- Region: Region Midtjylland
- Municipality: Ringkøbing-Skjern
- Parish: Sønder Lem Parish

Area
  - Urban: 1.8 km^{2} (0.69 sq mi)

Population (2026)
  - Urban: 1,379
  - Urban density: 770/km^{2} (2,000/sq mi)
- Time zone: UTC+1 (CET)
  - Summer (DST): UTC+2 (CEST)
- Postal code: DK-6940 Lem St.

Lem is a railway town in Ringkøbing-Skjern Municipality, Central Denmark Region, Denmark, with a population of 1,379 (1 January 2026). Lem is often called the "Town of Blacksmiths" because of the town's many iron and metal industries. The Danish wind turbine manufacturer Vestas traces its roots to Lem.

Lem is served by Lem railway station, located on the Esbjerg–Struer railway line.
