= Hotel Ringkøbing =

Hotel in Ringkøbing, Denmark

Coordinates: 56.0905°N 8.2434°E

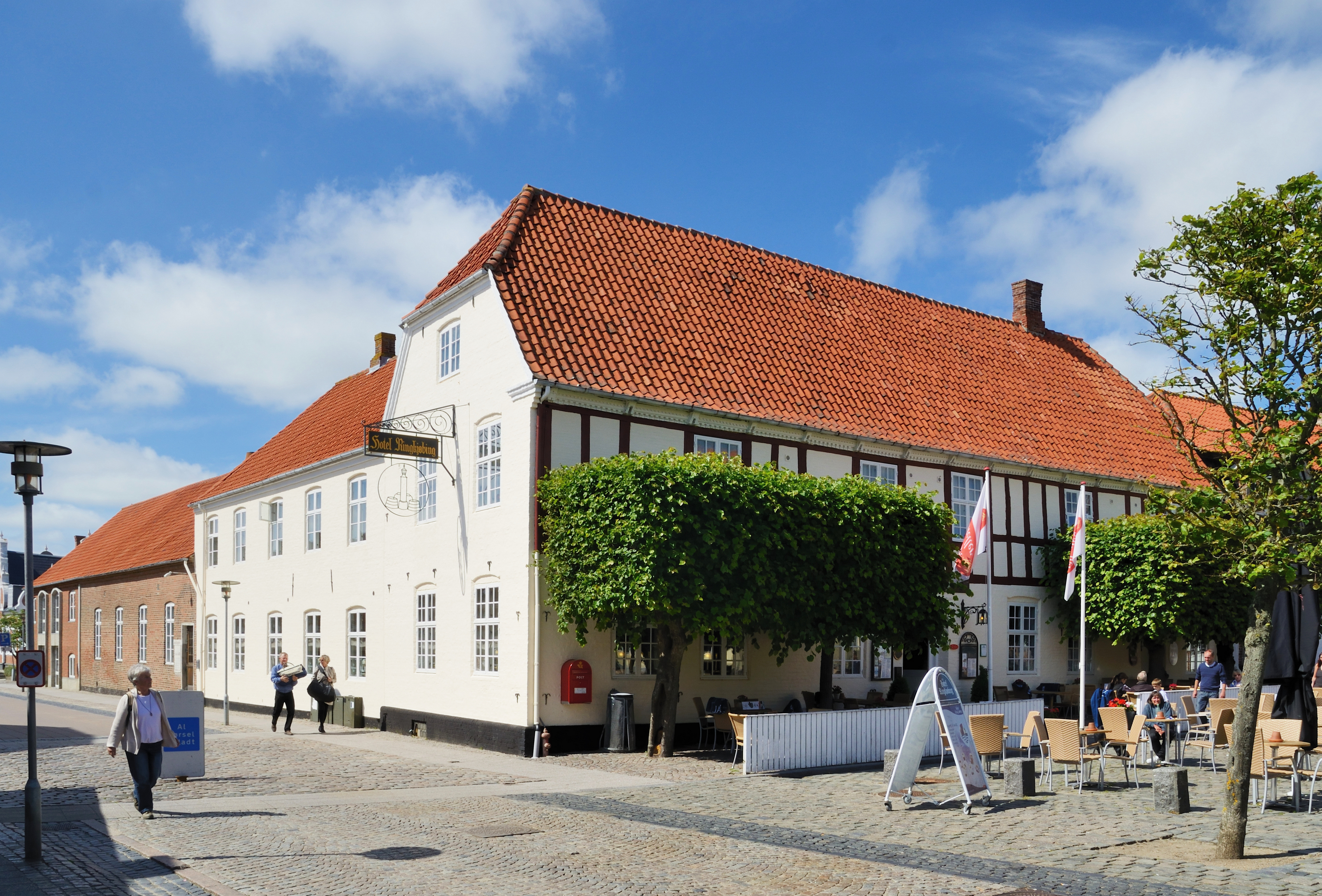
Hotel Ringkøbing

Hotel Ringkøbing is a hotel located on the central market square in Ringkøbing, Denmark. The oldest part of the building dates from the 17th century. It was listed in 1919. The hotel has 59 rooms, including 2 large with wheelchair access, and 4 banquet facilities for 25–100 people and small meeting rooms.
