= Hee, Denmark =

Hee
- Town
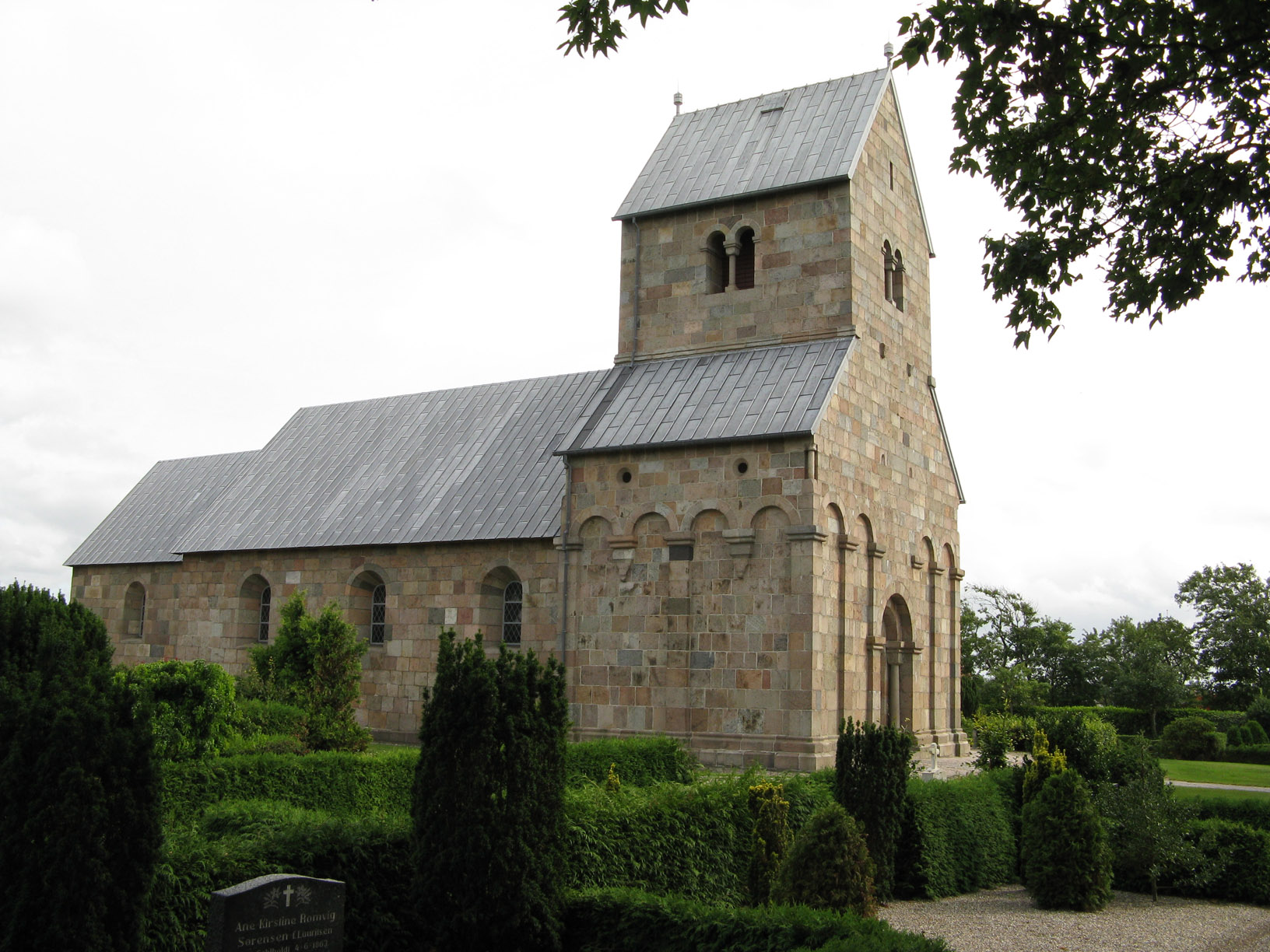
- Hee Church

- Location in Denmark Hee (Central Denmark Region)
- Coordinates: 56°8′43″N 8°16′58″E
- Country: Denmark
- Region: Central Denmark (Midtjylland)
- Municipality: Ringkøbing-Skjern

Population (2026)
  - Total: 483
- Time zone: UTC+1 (CET)
  - Summer (DST): UTC+2 (CEST)

Hee is a village located in the Ringkøbing-Skjern Municipality, in the Central Denmark Region. The village is served by Hee railway station on the Esbjerg-Struer railway line.

Hee Church, presumably erected in 1140's, is one of Denmark's most significant romanesque buildings.

== Notable people ==
- The politician J. C. Christensen lived for many years in Hee until his death in 1930.
