= Hjerm =

- Town
- Location within Denmark Location within Central Denmark Region
- Coordinates: 56°26′20″N 8°38′22″E
- Country: Denmark
- Region: Central Denmark (Midtjylland)
- Municipality: Struer Municipality

Area
  - Urban: 0.8 km^{2} (0.31 sq mi)

Population (2026)
  - Urban: 1,107
  - Urban density: 1,400/km^{2} (3,600/sq mi)
- Time zone: UTC+1 (CET)
  - Summer (DST): UTC+2 (CEST)
- Postal code: DK-7560 Hjerm

Hjerm is a railway town between Struer and Holstebro, with a population of 1,107 (1 January 2026), in Struer Municipality, Central Denmark Region in Denmark.

Hjerm is served by Hjerm railway station on the Esbjerg–Struer railway line.

== Churches ==
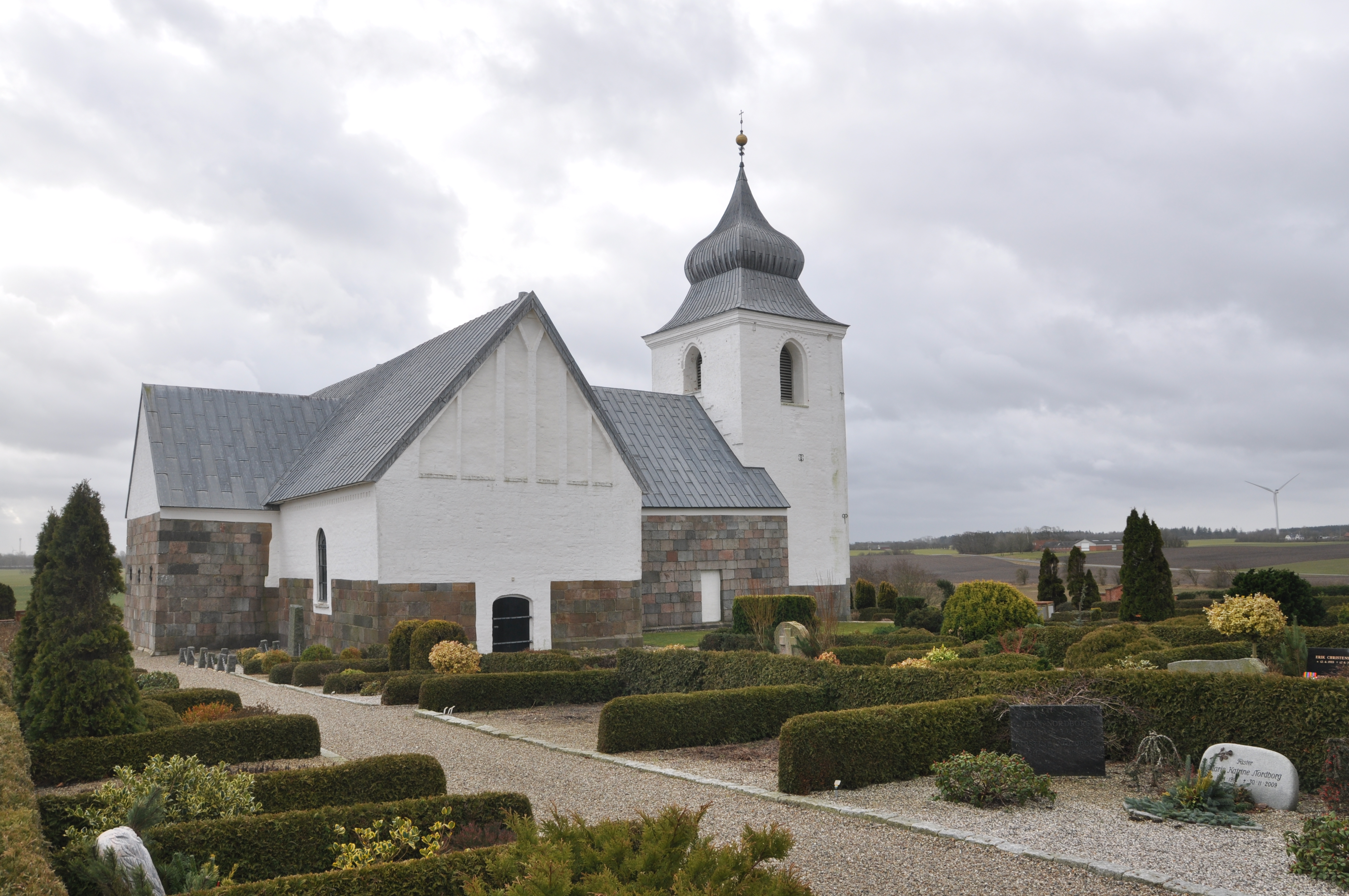
Hjerm Church West

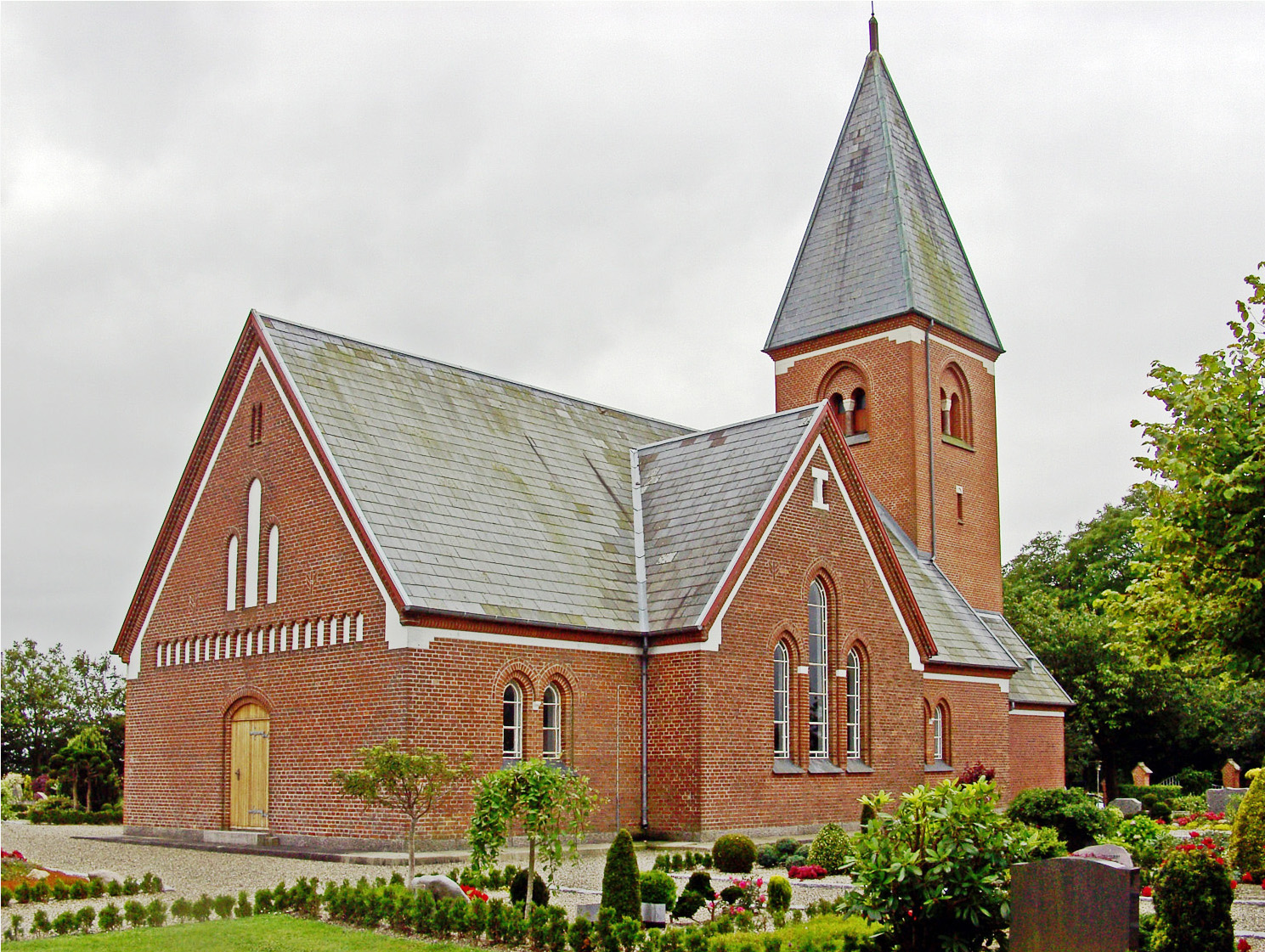
Hjerm Church East

There are two churches located in the Hjerm area. Hjerm Church West located just south of the town and Hjerm Church East located 3 km northeast of the town.

== Companies ==
Humlum Brød A/S was founded in the small town of Humlum in 1980 but is now located in Hjerm. It is a manufacturer of chilled dough (pizza, puff pastry, pie, sausage rolls ect.), frozen dough plates (especially puff pastry in different sizes), various frozen pie crusts and traditional Danish tartlets.

Ven-Po A/S is a manufacturer and international exporter of linch pins, pipe pins and spring pins.

== Notable people ==
- The actress and singer Grethe Sønck (1929–2010) was born in Hjerm.
