= Jens Christian Christensen =

Danish politician (1856–1930)

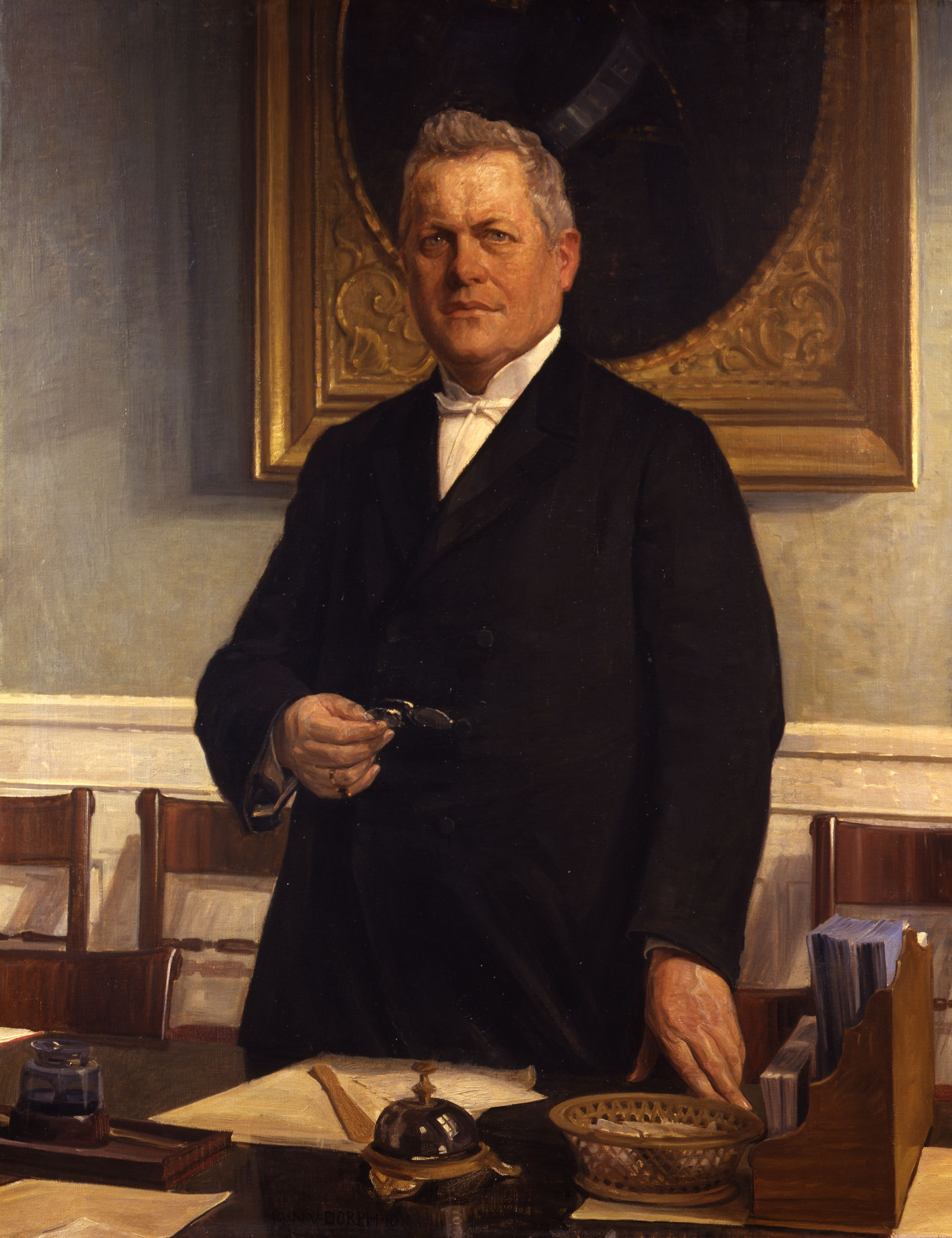
- J. C. Christensen by N. V. Dorph, 1910

Council President of Denmark
- In office 14 January 1905 – 12 October 1908
- Monarchs: Christian IX; Frederik VIII
- Preceded by: Johan Henrik Deuntzer
- Succeeded by: Niels Neergaard

Minister of Defence
- In office 16 September 1909 – 18 October 1909
- Prime Minister: Ludvig Holstein-Ledreborg
- Preceded by: Niels Neergaard
- Succeeded by: Ludvig Holstein-Ledreborg
- In office 14 January 1905 – 12 October 1908
- Prime Minister: Himself
- Preceded by: Position established
- Succeeded by: Niels Neergaard

Minister for Ecclesiastical Affairs
- In office 5 May 1920 – 15 August 1922
- Prime Minister: Niels Neergaard
- Preceded by: Emil Ammentorp
- Succeeded by: Jacob Appel

Speaker of the Folketing
- In office 15 March 1912 – 13 June 1913
- Monarchs: Frederik VIII; Christian X
- Preceded by: Anders Thomsen
- Succeeded by: Niels Pedersen-Nyskov

Personal details
- Born: 21 November 1856 Påbøl, West Jutland, Denmark
- Died: 19 December 1930 (aged 74) Hee (near Ringkøbing), Denmark
- Party: Venstre Reform
- Spouse: Karen Kirstine Pedersen
- Children: 4

Jens Christian Christensen (21 November 1856 – 19 December 1930), most often called J. C. Christensen with the 'J' pronounced as an 'I', was a Danish politician.

== Biography ==
Christensen was born into a West Jutland peasant family and starting as a herd boy, he was educated a teacher and joined politics at an early age. He was a member of the Danish Liberal Party until he founded the Venstre Reform Party in 1895. During later years, he successfully and adroitly led the opposition against the last Right cabinets, which resulted in the victory of parliamentarianism 1901. In the first Left cabinet of J. H. Deuntzer, Christensen was Minister of Cultus and the strongman of the government, introducing reforms in the village school system.

J. C. Christensen was Council President of Denmark from 1905 to 1908 as the leader of the Christensen I Cabinet and II. During this period he introduced female suffrage in local politics and tried to solve the problem of the defense. Also, he took the first steps towards a re-conciliation with the moderate liberals excluding the radicals. In addition, a law was passed in April 1907 that authorised state contributions for unemployment relief.

The Alberti scandal in 1908 led to his fall and weakened his position, but he was still the leader of his party participating in the second Carl Theodor Zahle cabinet 1916–1918. In 1920–1922, he was minister for the last time and two years later he left politics. During his last years he supported the cultivation of the moor of Jutland.

== Literature ==
- Dansk Biografisk Leksikon, vol. 3, Copenhagen, 1979.
- Svend Thorsen: De danske ministerier, vol. 1, Copenhagen, 1967.
- https://books.google.com/books?id=YCM5AQAAMAAJ&dq=denmark+unemployment+insurance+1907&pg=PA215

Political offices
Preceded by Jens Jacobsen Kokholm Bjerre	Kultus Minister of Denmark; 24 July 1901 – 14 January 1905	Succeeded by Enevold Sørensen
Preceded by Johan Henrik Deuntzer	Council President of Denmark; 14 January 1905 – 12 October 1908	Succeeded by Niels Neergaard
Preceded by New office	Defence Minister of Denmark; 14 January 1905 – 12 October 1908	Succeeded by Niels Neergaard
Preceded by Niels Neergaard	Defence Minister of Denmark; 16 September 1909 – 18 October 1909	Succeeded by Ludvig Holstein-Ledreborg
Preceded by Anders Thomsen	Speaker of the Folketing; 15 March 1912 – 13 June 1913	Succeeded by Niels Pedersen-Nyskov
Preceded by —	Minister without Portfolio of Denmark; 30 September 1916 – 18 January 1918	Succeeded by —
Preceded by Emil Ammentorp	Minister for Ecclesiastical Affairs of Denmark; 5 May 1920 – 15 August 1922	Succeeded by J. Christian Lindberg Appel
