= Grethe Sønck =

Danish actress and singer (1929–2010)

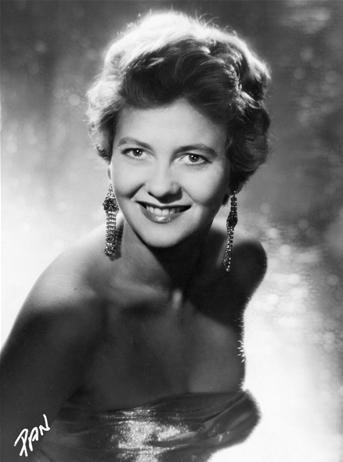
- Born: Grethe Ingeborg Nielsen Hald; 16 July 1929; Hjerm, Struer Municipality, Denmark
- Died: 12 February 2010 (aged 80); Rågeleje, Denmark
- Years active: 1960-2006
- Spouse(s): Hjalmar Nicolausen (1952–1960); Sejr Volmer-Sørensen (1968–1982)

Grethe Sønck (born Grethe Ingeborg Nielsen Hald; 16 July 1929 – 12 February 2010) was a Danish actress and singer.

She was born in Hjerm, near Struer. In 1946, she won a talent contest, and in 1947, she became a singer at the Restaurant Sommerlyst at Dyrehavsbakken. As a revue actress, she started in Cirkusrevyen at Dyrehavsbakken in 1962, and later came to Nykøbing Falster Revue.

== Personal life ==
Sønck first married Hjalmar Nicolausen from 1952 until 1960, then she married Sejr Volmer-Sørensen from 1968 until his death in 1982.

In 1968, she changed her surname to Sønck.

== Death ==
Grethe Sønck died on 12 February 2010 of natural causes at age 80, in her Rågeleje home.

== Filmography ==
- The Greeneyed Elephant (1960)
- Soldaterkammerater på efterårsmanøvre (1961)
- Don Olsen kommer til byen (1964)
- Der var engang (1966)
- Naboerne (1966)
- The Olsen Gang (1968)
- Dage i min fars hus (1968)
- Midt i en jazztid (1969)
- Revykøbing kalder (1973)
- Prins Piwi (1974)
- Familien Gyldenkål sprænger banken (1976)
- Krummerne (1991)
- Roser & persille (1993)
- Olsen-bandens sidste stik (1998)
- Krummerne – Så er det jul igen (2006)
