= Cornelia von Levetzow =

Danish author (1836–1921)

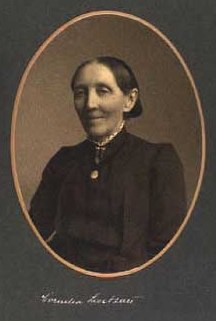
Cornelia von Levetzow

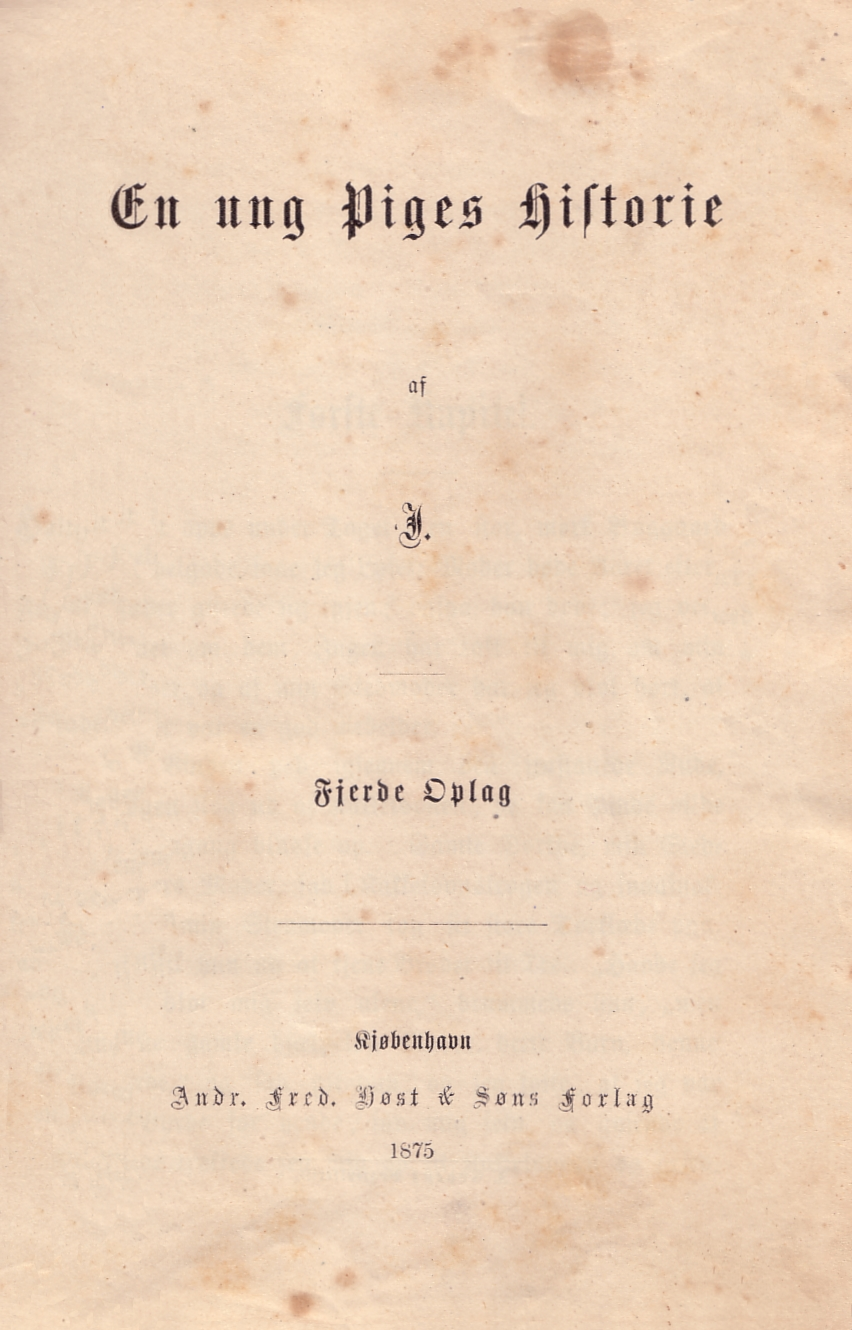
En ung Piges Historie by J

Cornelia Frederikke Juliane Victorine von Levetzow (1836–1921) was a popular Danish author of novels and short stories who published under the pen name J until 1894. Her first work, En ung Piges Historie (1861), a typically Danish governess novel, was a huge success which sold 50,000 copies in several editions and translations. Becoming increasingly religious in her writing, she published many more novels and short stories until 1908, some of them being published in several editions.

== Early life ==
Born on 14 January 1836 in Ringkøbing, Cornelia Frederikke Juliane Victorine von Levetzow was the daughter of the customs accountant Diedrich Vilhelm von Levetzow (1786–1849) and Edle Vilhelmine Fog (1793–1872). The youngest of five children, she was taught at home by her mother and her sisters Mathilde and Vilhelmine who also became writers. She lived in her parents' home in Ringkøbing until the family moved to Copenhagen after her father's death, finally settling in Lyngby in 1854.

== Career ==
Her literary career began when she was 24 with En ung Piges Historie (A Young Girl's Story, 1860) inspired by Charlotte Brontë's Jane Eyre. Like several other Scandinavian novels in the mid-19th century, it tells how a woman experiences hardship after seeking work as a governess outside the home but finally returns home to begin a happy life. It was a huge success, running to eight editions in Danish by the end of the 19th century and translated into several other languages.

The following year she published two more books, Fem Fortællinger (Five Tales, 1861) and Tre Fortællinger (Three Tales, 1861), both of which she had written before En ung Piges Historie. They also ran to several editions, as did subsequent works such as Anna (1863), To Fortællinger (Two Tales, 1866), Småskitser (Short Sketches, 1869) and Livsbilleder (Pictures of Life, 1874). Her fiction depicted both men and women as the principal characters, becoming increasingly religious in tone and conveying her views on the good life.

In 1875, after being awarded a travel grant, she spent two years in Sweden and Norway, returning to Denmark with many new ideas. After a pause for several years, she resumed publishing in 1881 with Fra det daglige Liv (From Everyday Life). A long series of new titles followed, culminating with Bodil (1908).

Cornelia von Levetzow died on 26 April 1921 in Lyngby, where she is buried.
