= Ringkøbing =

- Town
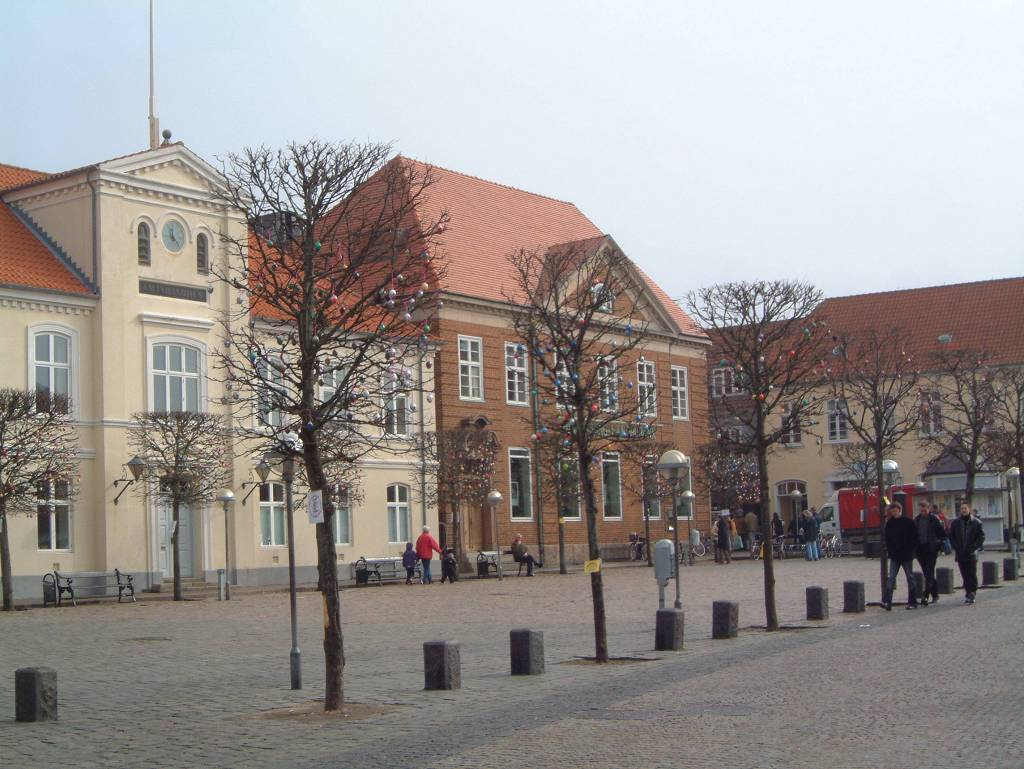
- The town square, Ringkøbing

- Coat of arms

- Location in Denmark Ringkøbing (Central Denmark Region)
- Coordinates: 56°5′23″N 8°14′18″E
- Country: Denmark
- Region: Central Denmark
- Municipality: Ringkøbing-Skjern

Area
  - Urban: 7.1 km^{2} (2.7 sq mi)

Population (2026)
  - Urban: 9,802
  - Urban density: 1,400/km^{2} (3,600/sq mi)
  - Gender: 4,715 males and 5,087 females
- Time zone: UTC+1 (CET)
  - Summer (DST): UTC+2 (CEST)
- Postal code: DK-6950 Ringkøbing

Ringkøbing (older spelling Ringkjøbing) is a town in Ringkøbing-Skjern Municipality in Region Midtjylland on the west coast of the Jutland peninsula in western Denmark. It has a population of 9,802 (1 January 2026).

== History ==
Archeological finds suggest that the town was founded in the 13th century. At that time it was the only real harbour town along the Danish west coast, being sheltered from the North Sea by the wall of Holmsland Dunes (Holmsland Klit).

In the 17th century, the strait connecting Ringkøbing Fjord to the North Sea began to move south under the influence of wind and tide; soon it was no longer navigable. Ringkøbing was cut off from the sea until the beginning of the 20th century, when a new channel was built at the town of Hvide Sande, in nearby Holmsland municipality.

The name Ringkøbing means "The market town near Rindum". By the 11th century, a church had been built in the small village of Rindum. The village is probably even older. Evidence of settlements dating back as far as the 6th century has been found.

On the 27th of January in 1443, the towns' privilege of "købstad" (Danish for market town) was cemented by the Danish king Christopher of Bavaria by royal charter. The royal privilege is most likely older, dating back to king Valdemar IV Atterdag, as the document cementing the royal privilege of the town mentions the original privilege originating from the reign of "King Valdemar".

At the end of World War II, Ringkøbing was involved in the British testing of captured German V-weapons. British soldiers, including radar experts from the British Artillery Regiment, were stationed there in October 1945 to monitor the accuracy of weapons fired from a base in Cuxhaven, Lower Saxony, Germany. The tests were part of the post-World War II justice process, to establish whether the use of V-weapons constituted indiscriminate killing of civilians. In fact, they proved to be very accurate, and the Nazis escaped this charge.

== Main sights ==
Today the centre of Ringkøbing has some quaint old streets, most of which lead towards the water of the fjord.

Ringkøbing Church was built in the early 15th century, and its tower, which is wider on top than on the bottom, was erected ca. 1550. The church houses two organs: the oldest in the west pulpit was built by Demant & Son in 1861 with a baroque facade from 1633; the other from 1974 is by Frobenius & Sons. As the result of a restoration in 1995–1996, the church has a number of modern features, including an altarpiece by Arne Haugen Sørensen and a glass baptismal font.

== Economy ==
Ringkjøbing Landbobank is headquartered in Ringkøbing.

== Transportation ==
=== Rail ===
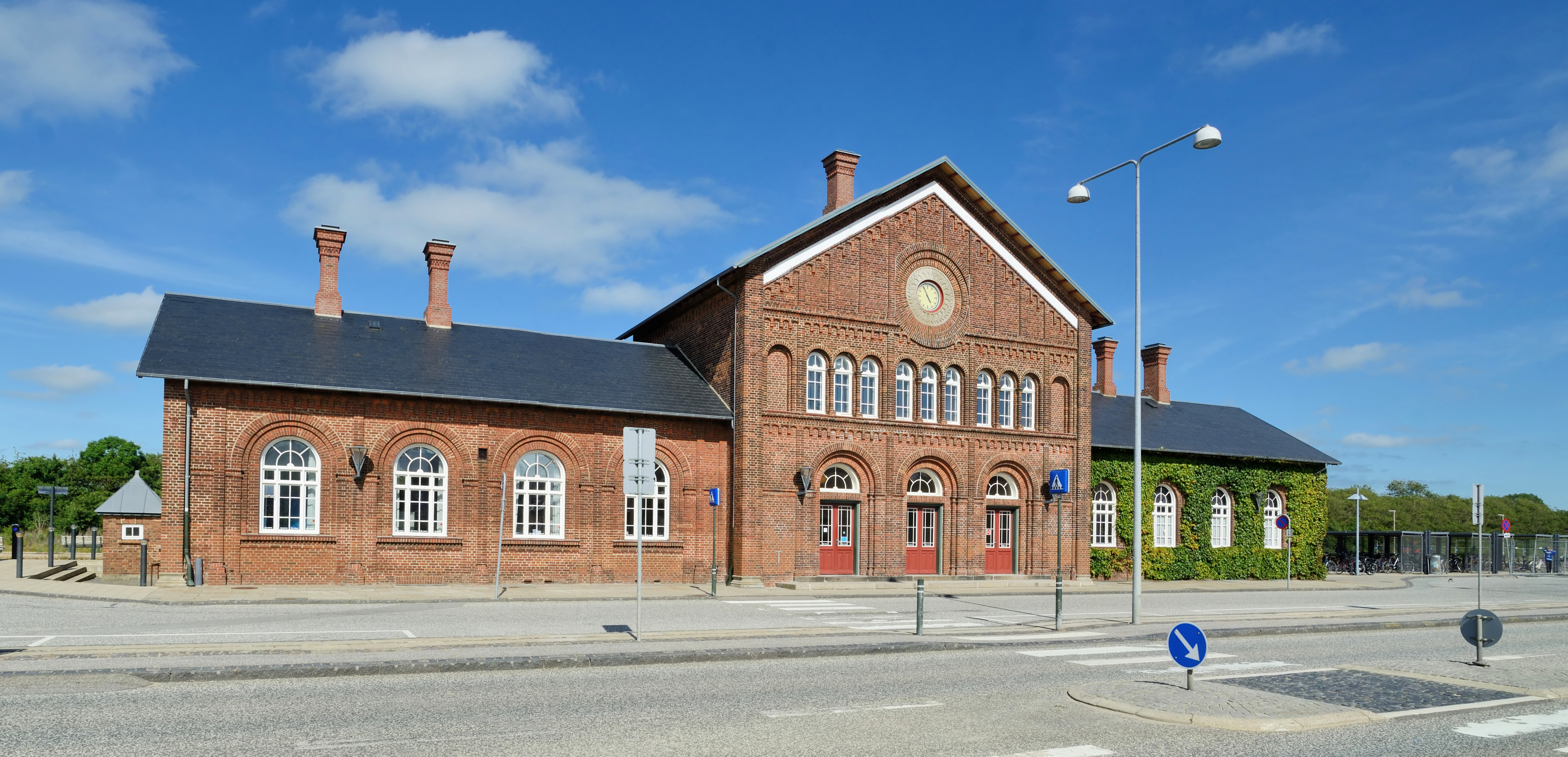
Front facade of Ringkøbing railway station.

Ringkøbing is served by Ringkøbing railway station. It is located on the Esbjerg-Struer railway line and offers regional train services to Skjern and Holstebro with onward connections to the rest of Denmark.

== Notable people ==
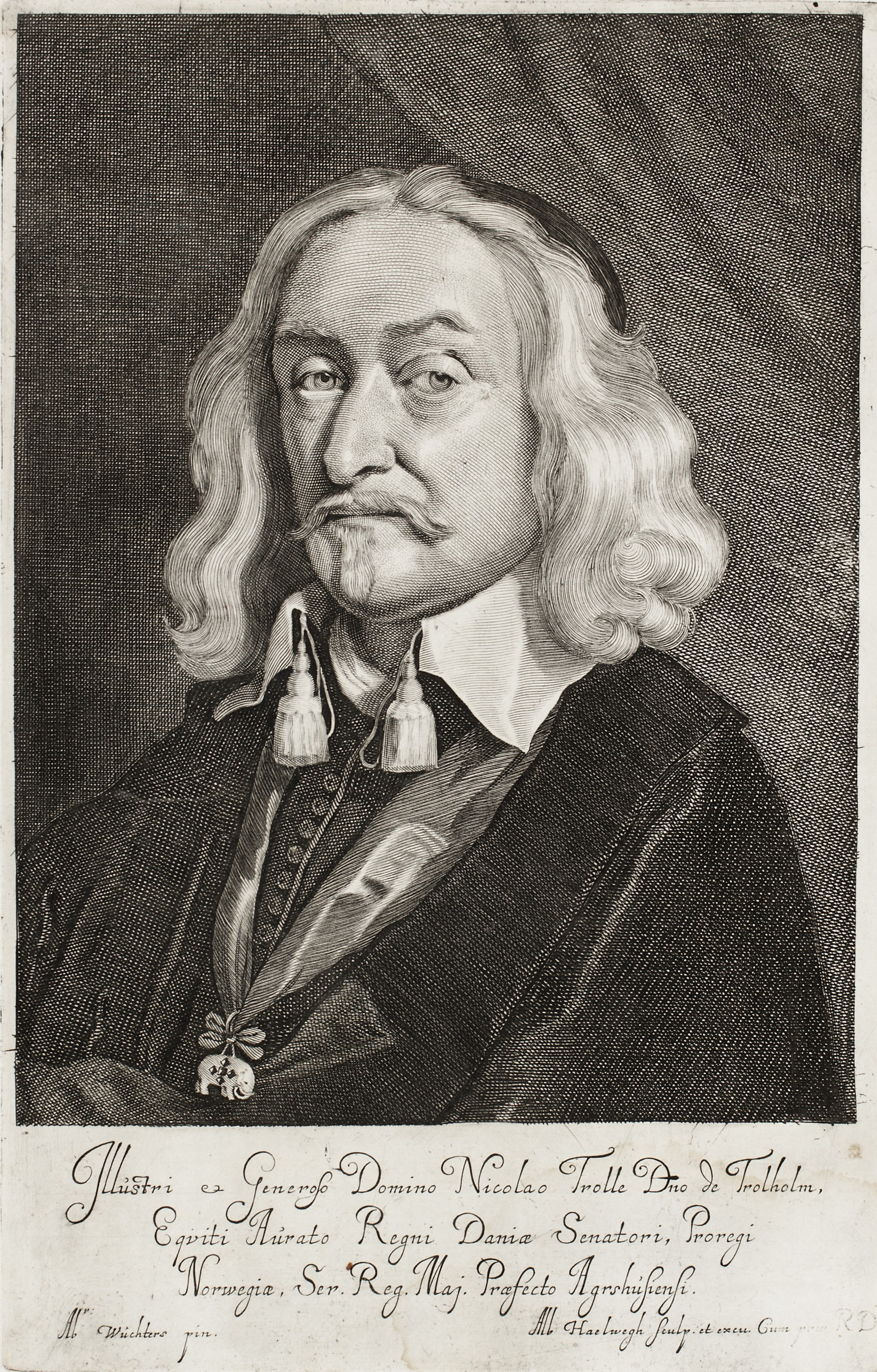
Niels Trolle, 1650

- Niels Trolle (1599 in Ringkøbing –1667) a nobleman, vice admiral and Governor-General of Norway
- Stephen Hansen (1701 in Skodsbøl – 1770) an industrialist, businessman and General War Commissioner
- Wilhelm Sponneck (1815 in Ringkøbing – 1888) a nobleman (rigsgreve) and Minister of Finance
- Janus la Cour (1837 near Ringkøbing – 1909) a painter of the classical Eckersberg school
- Ludvig Mylius-Erichsen (1872 in Ringkøbing – 1907) an author and explorer of Greenland
- Mikkel Frandsen (1892 in Sønder Lem – 1981) a Danish American physical chemist noted for experiments involving chemical thermodynamics and heavy water
- Poul Andersen (1922 in Ringkøbing – 2006) a printer, served in the Danish resistance movement during WWII and later published one of the remaining two Danish-language newspapers in the USA
- Vibeke Hastrup (1958 in Vedersø) an actress who has worked in theatre, television and film
- Cornelia von Levetzow (1836–1921), successful novelist
- Mette Lykke (born 1981 in Ringkøbing) a Danish businesswoman, entrepreneur and investor
- Anna Saba Lykke Oehlenschlæger a Danish singer who represented Denmark at Eurovision 2024, was raised in Ringkøbing

=== Sport ===
- Claus Møller Jakobsen (born 1976 in Ringkøbing) a Danish former professional handballer, sports commentator for TV2
- Jacob Larsen (1979 in Egvad) a Danish cricketer
- Hans Henrik Andreasen (born 1979 in Ringkøbing) a retired Danish footballer with over 500 club caps
- Niels Lodberg (born 1980 in Ringkøbing) is a former Danish footballer with over 350 club caps
- Jonas Borring (born 1985 in Ringkøbing) is a retired Danish footballer with over 350 club caps

== Gallery ==
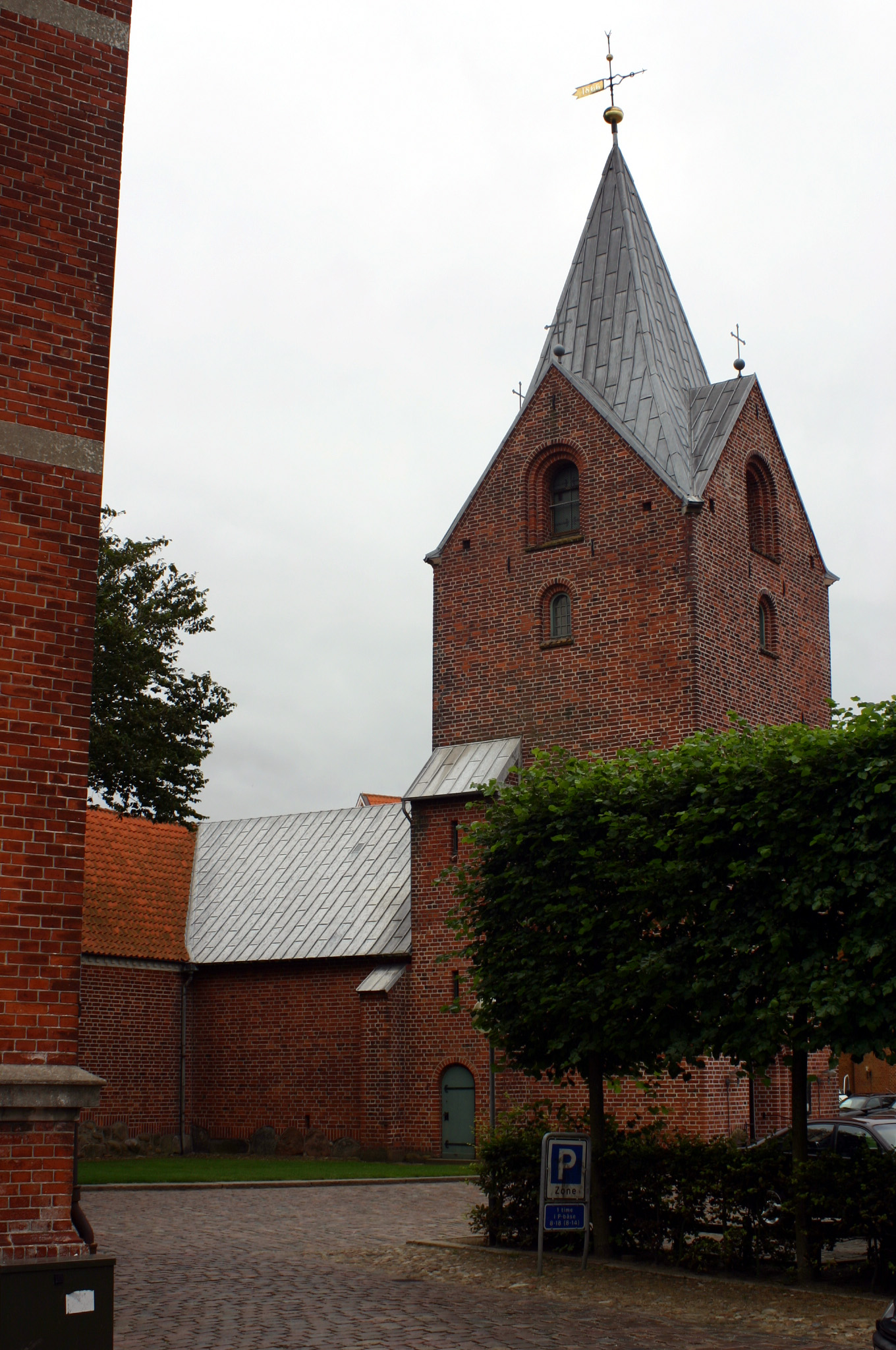
Ringkøbing Church (Ringkøbing Kirke)

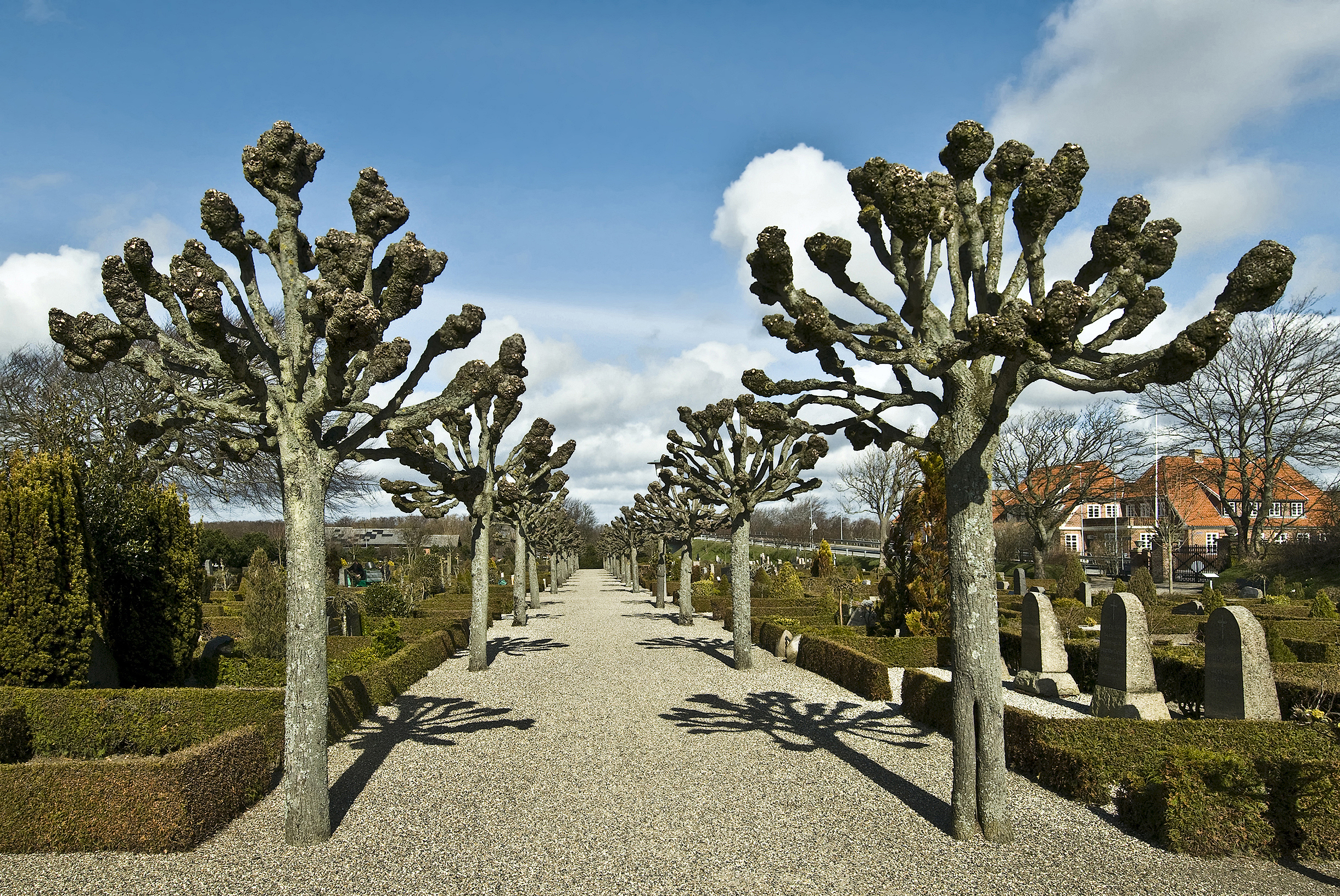
Avenue with linden in the cemetery by Ringkøbing

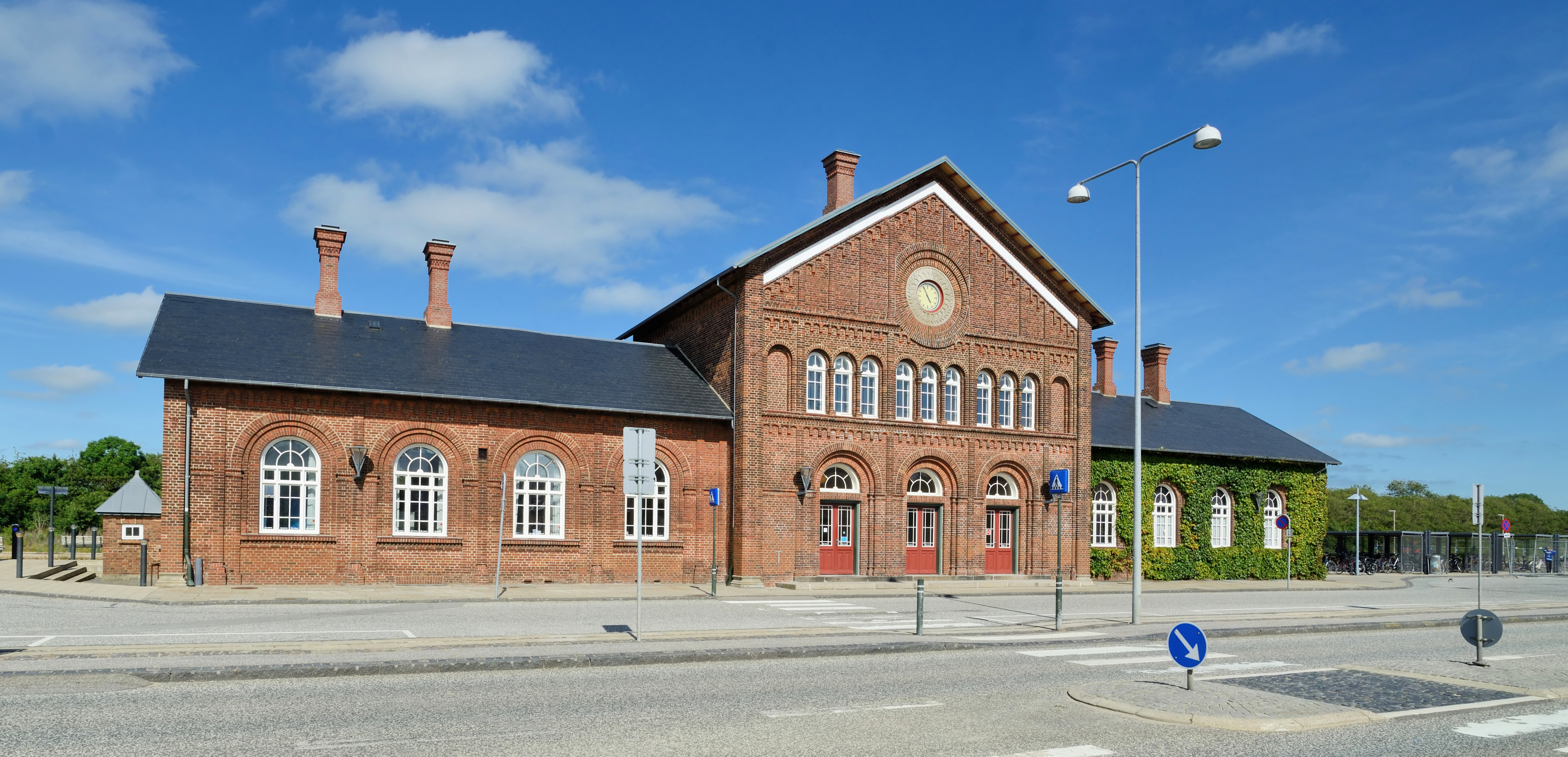
Ringkøbing railway station

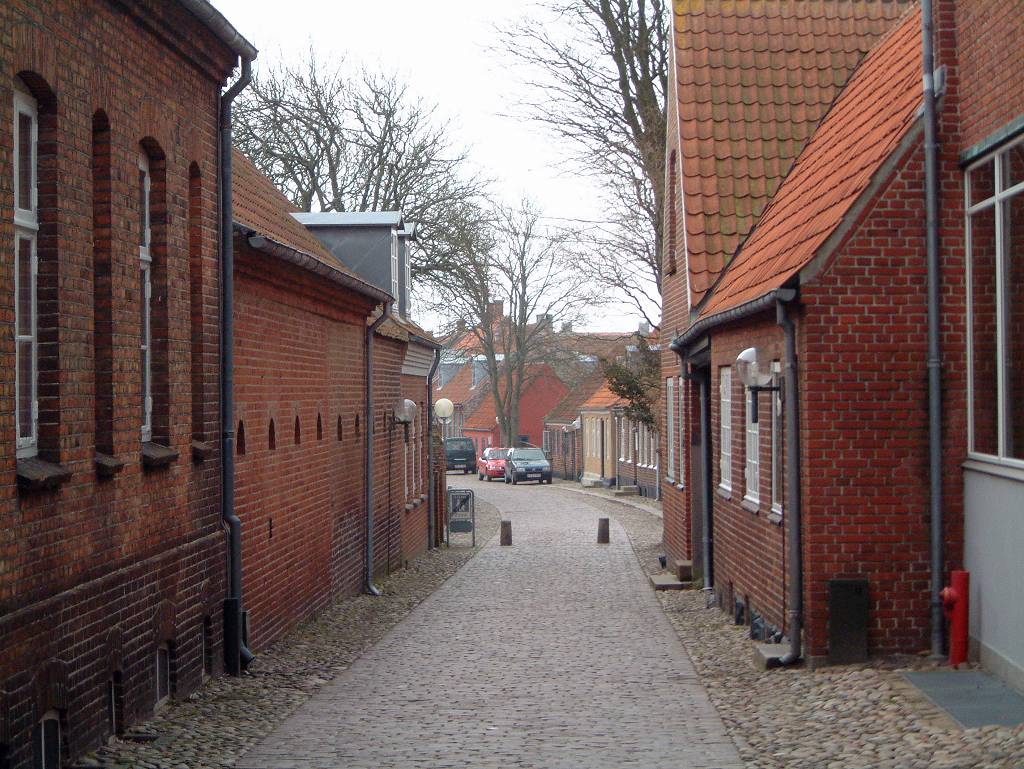
Typical street in Ringkøbing

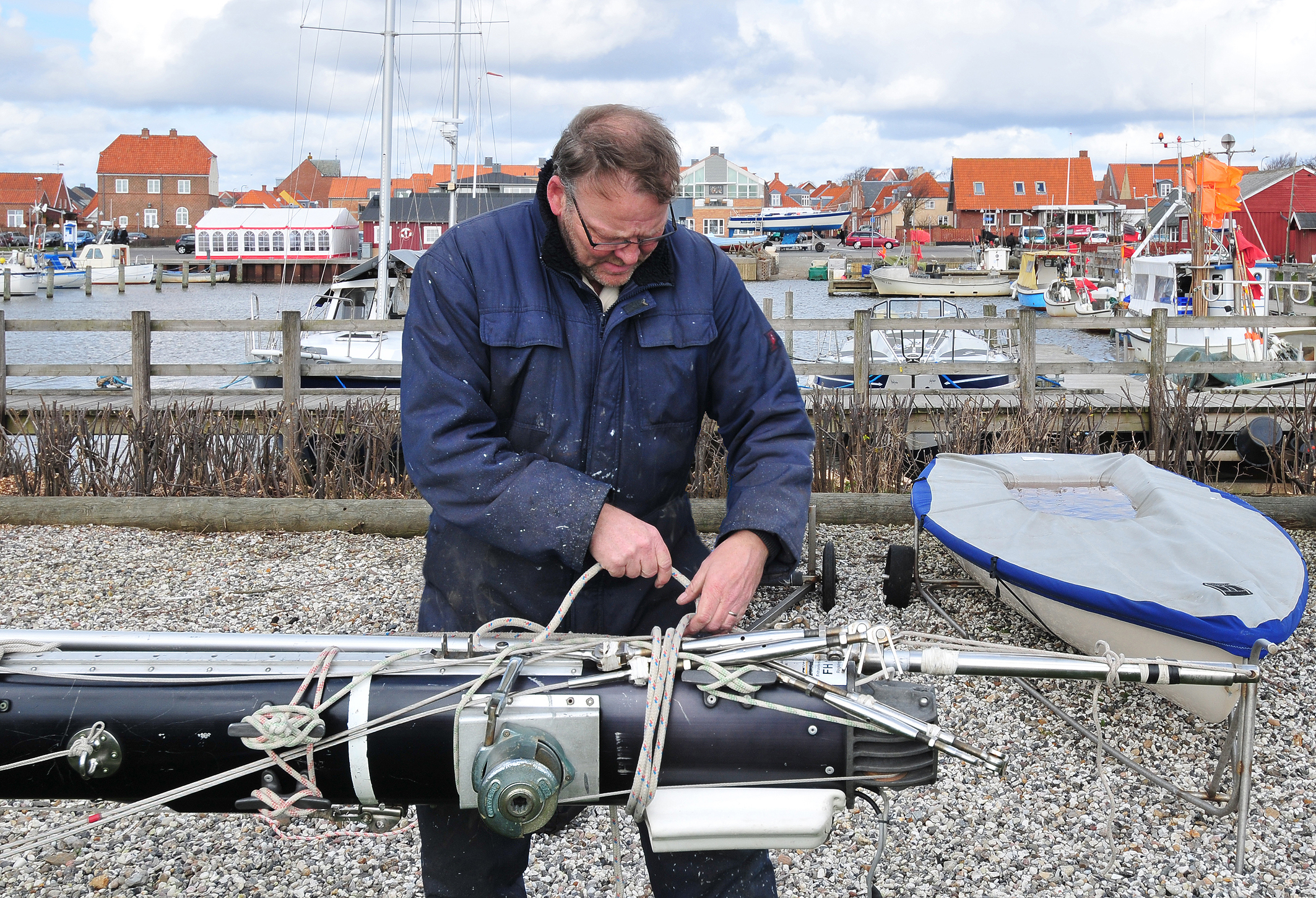
Dockworker in the harbour of Ringkøbing
