= Skjern railway station =

Railway station in West Jutland, Denmark

Skjern
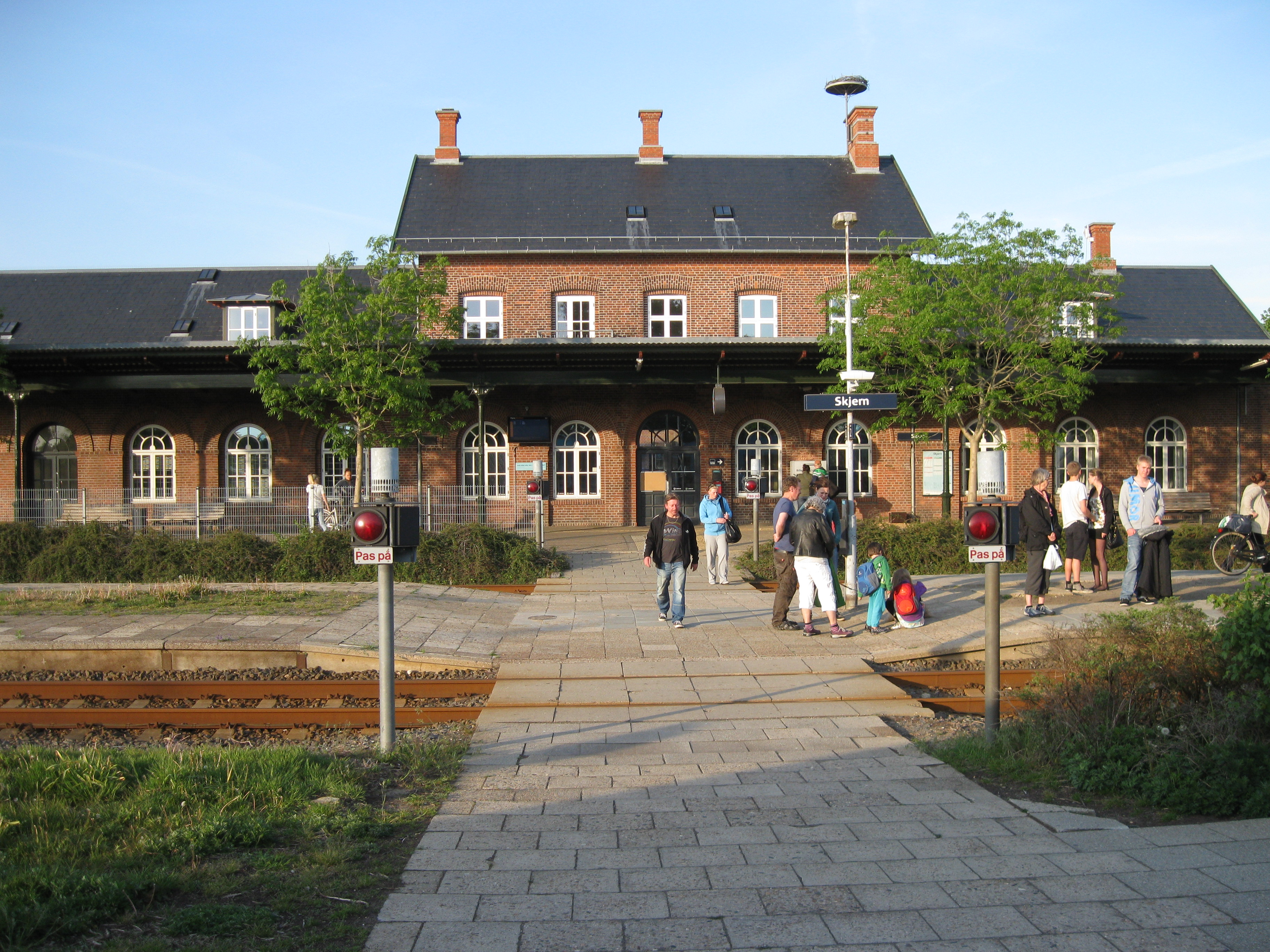
- Skjern station in 2011

General information
- Location: Bredgade 55; 6900 Skjern; Ringkøbing-Skjern Municipality; Denmark
- Coordinates: 55°56′51″N 08°29′32″E
- Elevation: 5.0 metres (16.4 ft)
- Owner: DSB (station infrastructure); Banedanmark (rail infrastructure)
- Lines: West Jutland longitudinal railway line Skanderborg–Skjern railway line
- Platforms: 2
- Tracks: 3
- Train operators: GoCollective; Midtjyske Jernbaner

Construction
- Architect: Niels Peder Christian Holsøe

History
- Opened: 8 August 1875

Services
Preceding station	GoCollective	Following station
Tarm towards Esbjerg	Esbjerg–Skjern Regional train	Terminus
Terminus	Aarhus–Skjern Regional train	Borris towards Aarhus Central
Preceding station	Midtjyske Jernbaner	Following station
Terminus	Skjern–Holstebro Regional train	Lem towards Holstebro
Location

Skjern railway station is a railway station serving the town of Skjern in West Jutland, Denmark.

The station is located on the West Jutland longitudinal railway line (Danish: Den Vestjyske Længdebane) from Esbjerg to Struer and is the western terminus of the Skanderborg–Skjern railway line from Skanderborg to Skjern. It offers regional train services to Aarhus, Esbjerg, Herning and Holstebro. The train services are currently operated by the railway companies GoCollective and Midtjyske Jernbaner.

== History ==
Skjern station was opened on 8 August 1875 with the opening of the Varde-Ringkøbing section of the West Jutland longitudinal railway line (Danish: Den Vestjyske Længdebane) from Esbjerg to Struer. In 1881, Skjern station also became the western terminus of the Herning-Skjern section of the Skanderborg–Skjern railway line.

On 15 November 1920 Skjern station also became the southern terminus of the new Skjern-Videbæk railway line, which connected Skjern with the village of Videbæk. This railway line was meant to be prolonged to Skive but this was never realized. Passenger traffic on the Skjern-Videbæk railway line stopped on 2 October 1955, with freight traffic on the line continuing until 1 June 1981.

== Architecture ==
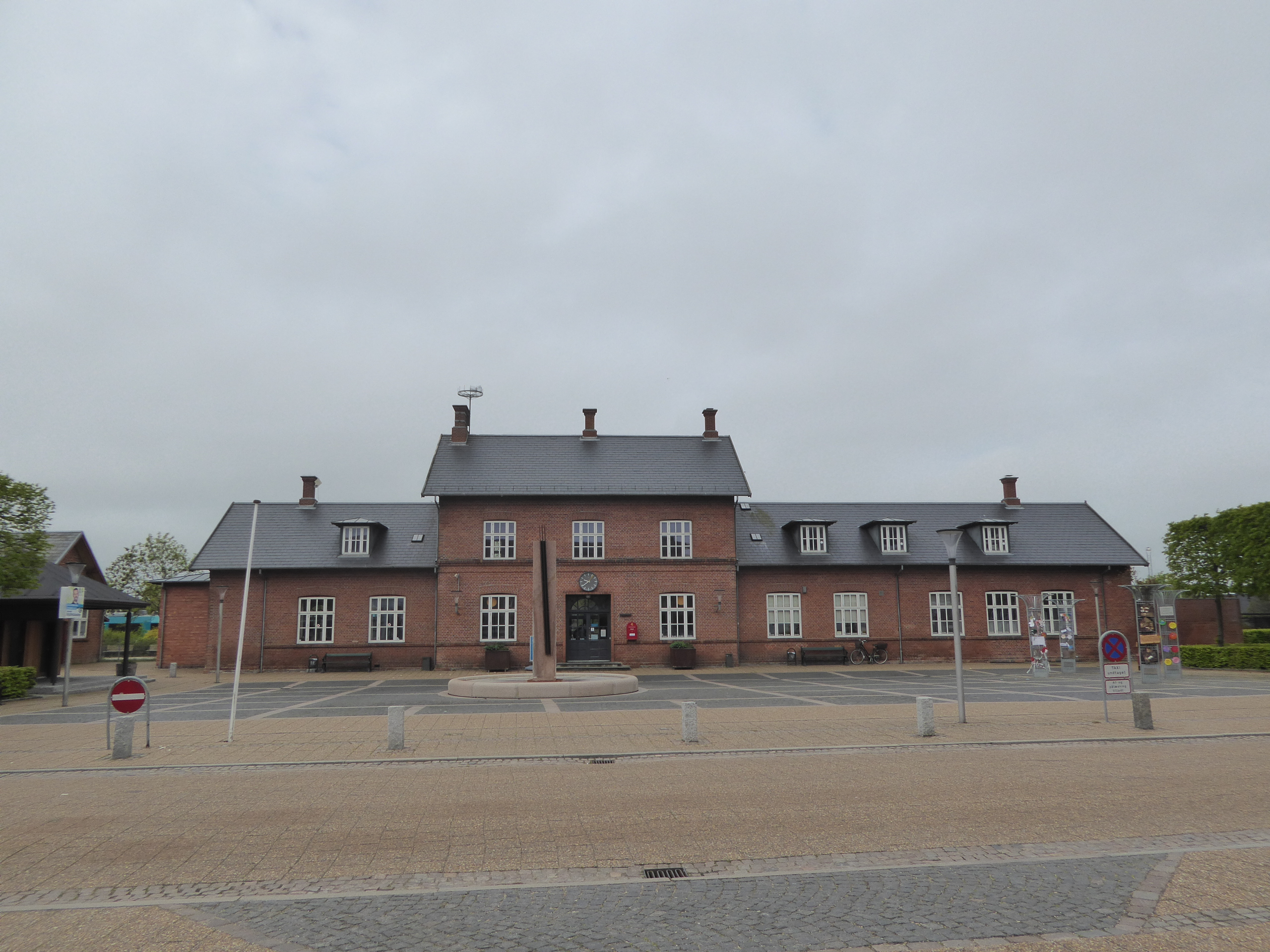
Street facade of Skjern station in 2019.

Like the other stations on the Esbjerg–Struer railway line, the still existing station building from 1875 was built to designs by the Danish architect Niels Peder Christian Holsøe (1826–1895), known for the numerous railway stations he designed across Denmark in his capacity of head architect of the Danish State Railways.

== Facilities ==
The station building contains ticket machines, a waiting room and toilets.

== Operations ==
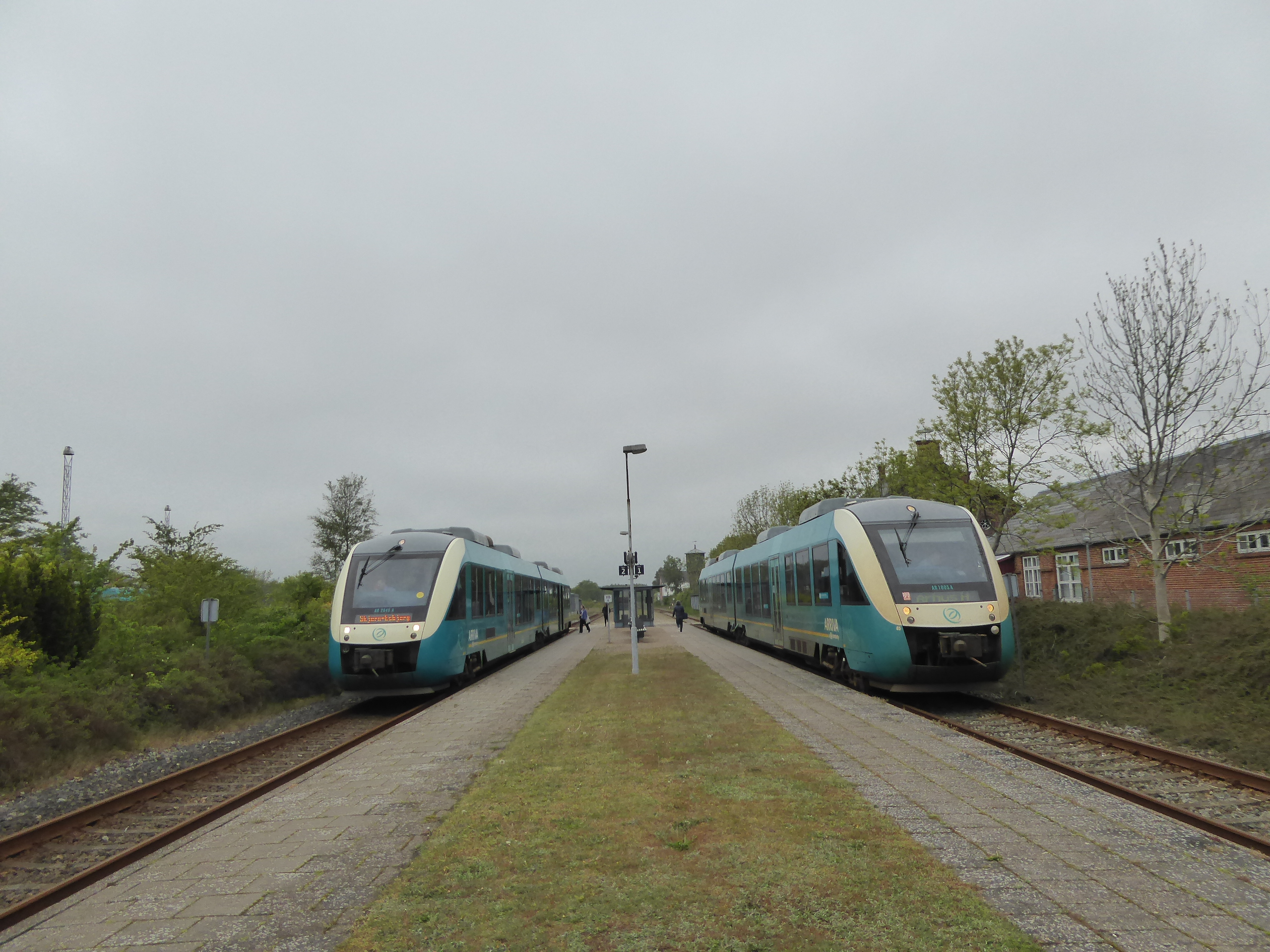
Two Arriva Lint 41 railcars for Esbjerg and Aarhus at Skjern station.

The train services are operated by the railway companies GoCollective and Midtjyske Jernbaner. The station offers direct regional train services to Aarhus, Esbjerg, Herning and Holstebro.

== See also ==
- List of railway stations in Denmark
