= Holstebro railway station =

Railway station in Holstebro, Denmark

Holstebro
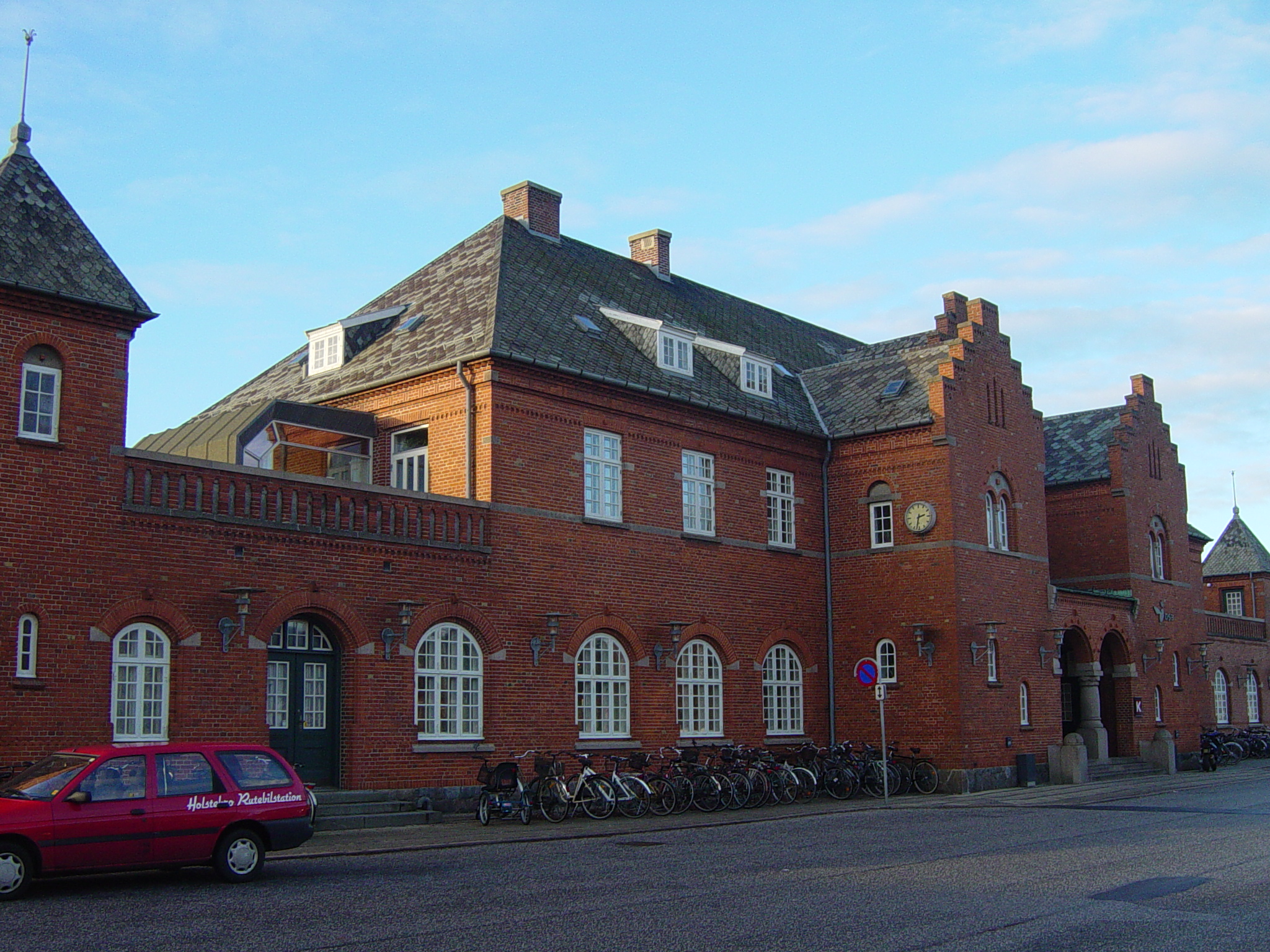
- Front facade of Holstebro station

General information
- Location: Stationsvej 15; 7500 Holstebro; Holstebro Municipality; Denmark
- Coordinates: 56°21′55″N 8°37′14″E
- Elevation: 23.3 metres (76 ft)
- Owner: DSB (station infrastructure); Banedanmark (rail infrastructure)
- Lines: Vejle-Holstebro Line; Esbjerg-Struer Line
- Platforms: 3
- Tracks: 3
- Train operators: DSB; GoCollective; Midtjyske Jernbaner

Construction
- Architect: Niels Peder Christian Holsøe (1866); Heinrich Wenck (1904)

History
- Opened: 1 November 1866
- Rebuilt: 1904

Services
Preceding station	DSB	Following station
Aulum towards Copenhagen Airport	Copenhagen-Herning-Struer InterCityLyn	Hjerm towards Struer
Preceding station	GoCollective	Following station
Aulum towards Vejle	Vejle–Struer Regional train	Hjerm towards Struer
Preceding station	Midtjyske Jernbaner	Following station
Bur towards Skjern	Skjern–Holstebro Regional train	Terminus
Location

Holstebro station (Danish: Holstebro Banegård or Holstebro Station) is a railway station serving the town of Holstebro in Jutland, Denmark.

Holstebro station is a railway junction where the Vejle-Holstebro Line and the Esbjerg-Struer Line meet. The station was opened in 1866 with the opening of the Struer-Holstebro section of the Esbjerg-Struer Line. The station building was designed by the Danish architect Heinrich Wenck. It offers direct InterCityLyn services to Copenhagen operated by DSB as well as regional train services Fredericia, Aarhus and Struer operated by GoCollective and to Skjern operated by Midtjyske Jernbaner.

== Architecture ==
The original station building from 1866 was designed by the Danish architect Niels Peder Christian Holsøe. It was replaced by the current station building designed by Heinrich Wenck in 1904. The station building was listed in 1992.

== See also ==
- List of railway stations in Denmark
