= Skjern, Denmark =

Skjern
- Town
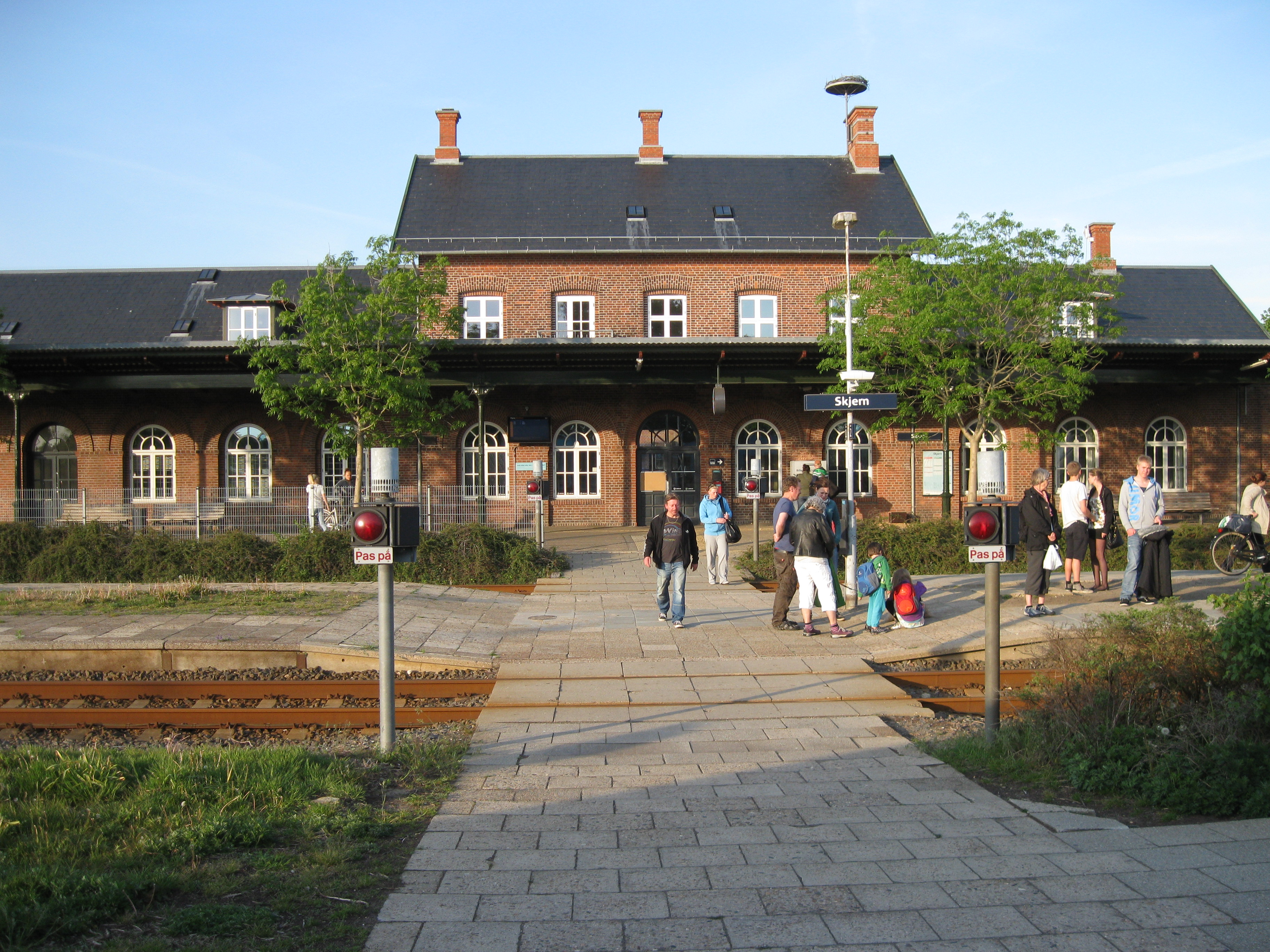
- Skjern railway station

- Location in Denmark Skjern (Central Denmark Region)
- Coordinates: 55°56′52″N 08°29′48″E
- Country: Denmark
- Region: Region Midtjylland
- Municipality: Ringkøbing-Skjern

Area
  - Urban: 7 km^{2} (2.7 sq mi)

Population (2026)
  - Urban: 7,775
  - Urban density: 1,100/km^{2} (2,900/sq mi)
  - Gender: 3,807 males and 3,968 females
- Time zone: UTC+1 (CET)
  - Summer (DST): UTC+2 (CEST)
- Postal code: DK-6900 Skjern

Skjern is a railway town just north of the Skjern river in western Jutland, Denmark with a population of 7,775 (1 January 2026). The town was the seat of the former Skjern Municipality, though since 2007 it has been the joint administrative seat of Ringkøbing-Skjern Municipality.

The town's expansion in the 19th century was the result of the newly created Skjern railway station. Today, it is connected to the Esbjerg–Struer line and the Skanderborg–Skjern line. It is also served by the Stauning Vestjylland Airport, which also contains Danmarks Flymuseum, displaying historic aircraft.

== History ==
According to legend, King John was thrown from his horse in the ford crossing Skjern river in 1513. He died on 20 February of that year, most likely from pneumonia as a result of the river's cold water.

In 1875, the a station on the Esbjerg–Struer railway line opened in Skjern. The town then became the site of a railway junction in 1881 when the Skanderborg–Skjern line opened. The town grew rapidly as a result of the railway traffic. In 1879 it consisted of a church and parsonage, school, inn, general store, and a smattering of farms and houses. By 1904, the town had more than 1120 inhabitants, as well as several schools, mission houses, banks, hotels, and industrial works. In the mid 20th century, the town's economy was primarily based upon industrial work. According to the 1930 census, of Skjern's 2,985 residents, 94 worked in agriculture, 1146 in industry, 424 in trade, 496 in transportation, and 298 in housework.

For a short period around 1940, Skern was the common spelling used for the town. In 1958, the town was designated a market town (Danish: købstad) as the last town in Denmark before the designation lost its official significance in the 1970 municipal reforms. Through the reforms, Skjern became the seat of the newly formed Skjern Municipality which included the parishes of Bølling, Dejbjerg, Faster, Hanning, Skjern, Stauning, Sædding, and Sønder Borris. The municipality has since been merged to form Ringkøbing-Skjern Municipality.

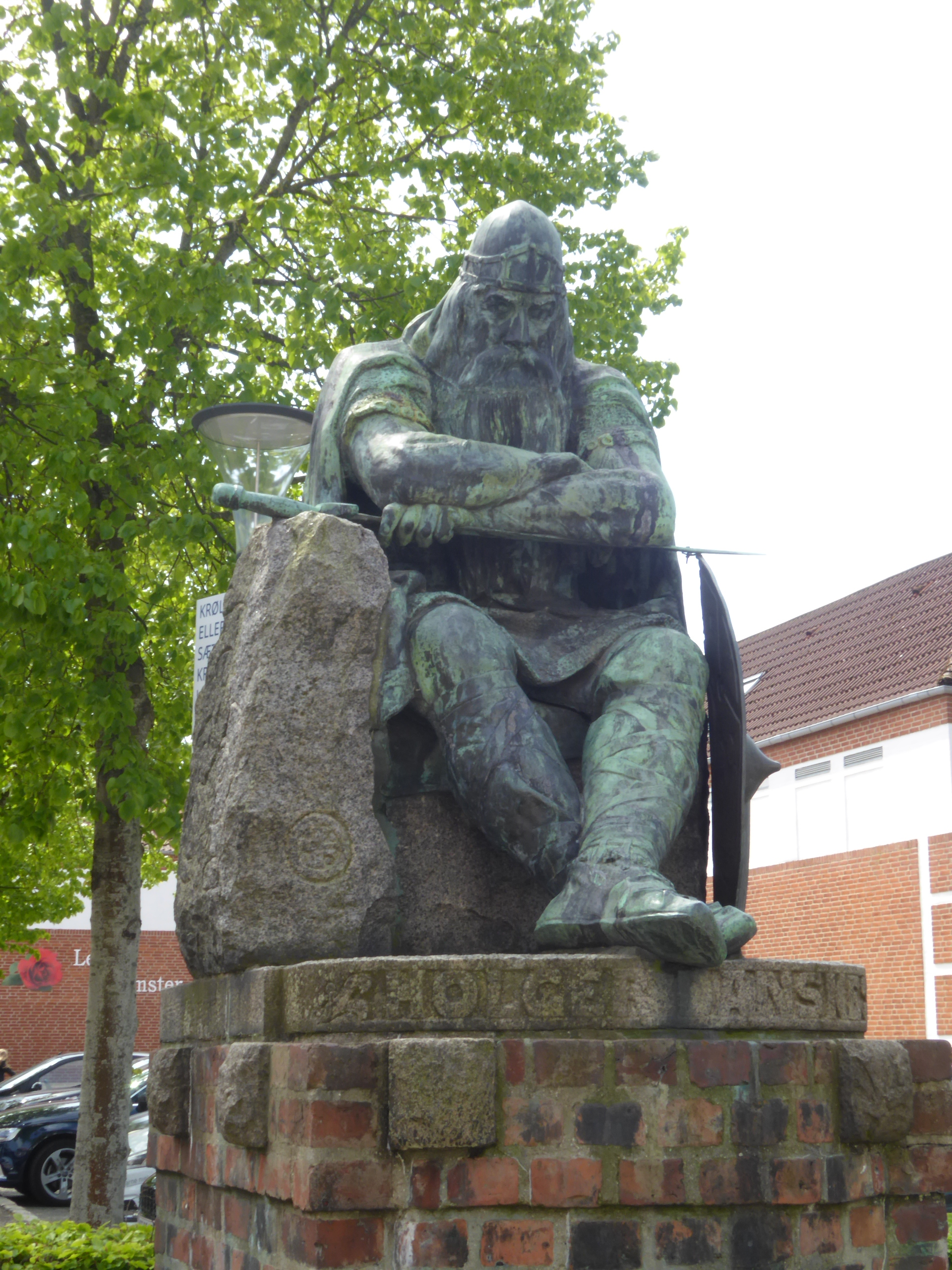
Statue of Holger Danske in Skjern.

A statue of Holger Danske by Hans Peder Pedersen-Dan was moved to Skjern in 2013 from the Hotel Marienlyst in Helsingør after it was sold on an auction site. The statue is now a tourist attraction in Skjern.

== Sports ==
The local handball club Skjern Håndbold plays in the top division and has won the Danish Championship twice; in 1999 and 2018.

== Popular culture ==
Skjern is the hometown of the player character in the 2017 computer role-playing game Expeditions: Viking.

== Notable people ==
- Martin Borch (born 1852 at Skerngaard near Skjern – 1937) a Danish architect
- Egon Hansen (born 1931 in Skjern – 2002) a Danish sports shooter, competed in the 1972 Summer Olympics
- Gnags (formed 1966 in Skjern) a Danish rock band formed by brothers Peter & Jens Nielsen
- Kristian Gjessing (born 1978 in Skjern) a Danish retired handball player, played for Skjern Håndbold and for Denmark
- Marianne Bonde (born 1984 in Skjern) a Danish retired handball player, played for Slagelse DT and for Denmark
- Trine Troelsen (born 1985 in Skjern) a Danish retired handball player, played for FC Midtjylland Håndbold and for Denmark
- Kasper Søndergaard (born 1981 in Skjern) a Danish retired Handball player, played for Skjern Håndbold and for Denmark
- Mathias Gidsel (born 1999 in Skjern) a Danish handball player, player for GOG Håndbold, Füchse Berlin and for Denmark

== See also ==
- Skjern railway station
- Skjern River
- Skjern Håndbold, a handball club from Skjern
