= Midtjyske Jernbaner =

Danish railway company

Midtjyske Jernbaner A/S
- Company type: Aktieselskab
- Industry: Transportation
- Predecessor: Vemb-Lemvig-Thyborøn Jernbane A/S & Hads-Ning Herreders Jernbane A/S
- Founded: 2008
- Headquarters: Lemvig, Denmark
- Area served: Region Midtjylland, Denmark
- Products: Public transport
- Services: Passenger transportation
- Website: www.mjba.dk

Midtjyske Jernbaner A/S (MJBA) is a Danish railway company operating in Region Midtjylland, Denmark.

The company was founded in 2008 as a merger of the operating companies Vemb-Lemvig-Thyborøn Jernbane A/S and Hads-Ning Herreders Jernbane A/S. Headquartered in Lemvig, the company is responsible for running the Lemvig railway line line and the railway line between Holstebro and Skjern.

The company operates the old Y-trains on the Lemvigbanen. They were delivered in 1983, and the line is the last place they are in service. The company has been looking for new trains in recent years because of difficulties with getting spare parts and 330 million kroner has been given from the region to finance the purchase of four of the seven planned battery trains, which will be put into service in the first half of 2025. The chosen model is the Siemens Mireo.

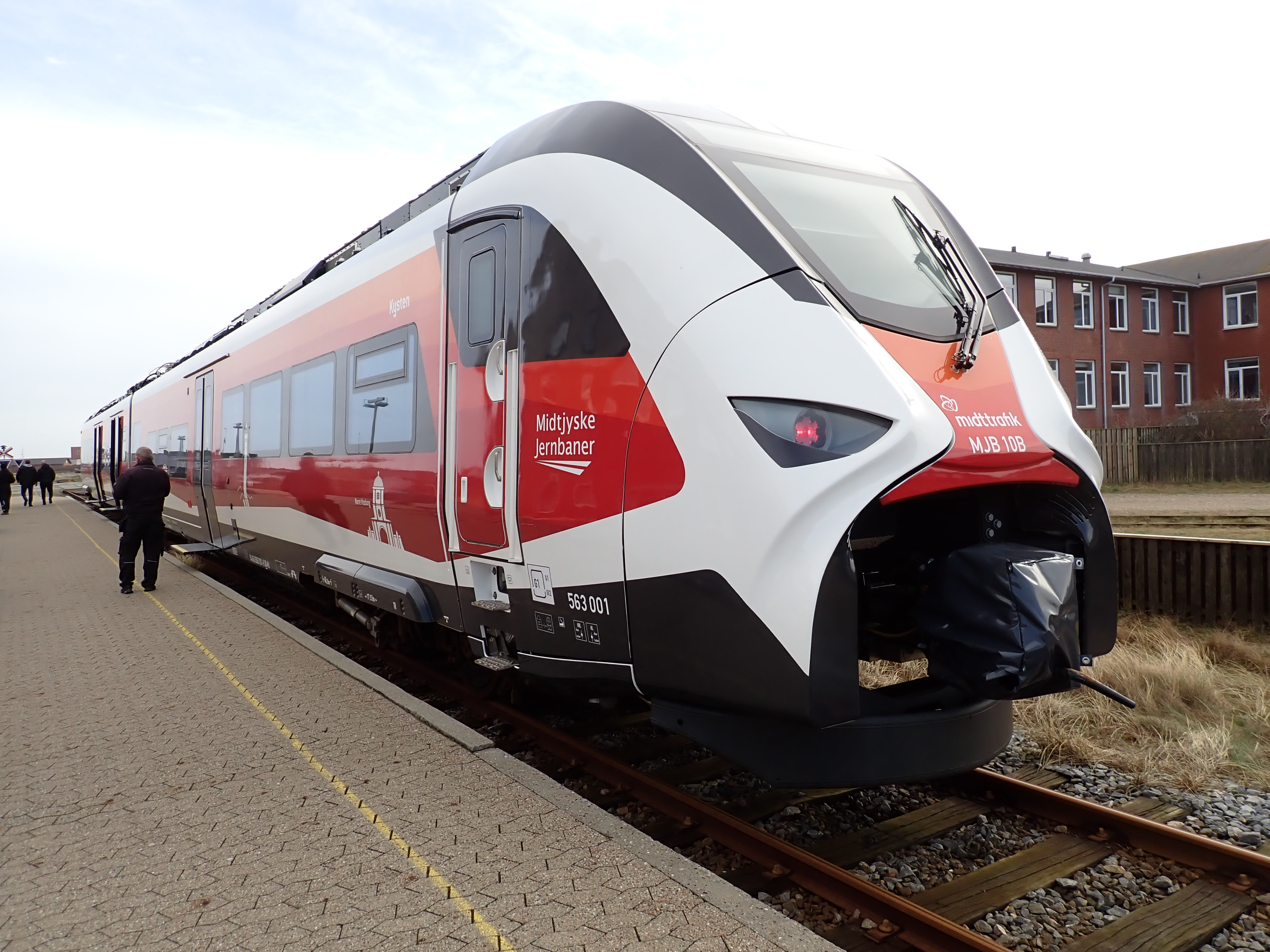
MJB 10B på Thyborøn havn station

Between Skjern and Holstebro, the company operates four Siemens Desiro train sets.

== See also ==
- Lemvigbanen
- Odderbanen
- Rail transport in Denmark
