= Esbjerg–Struer railway line =

Railway line in Denmark

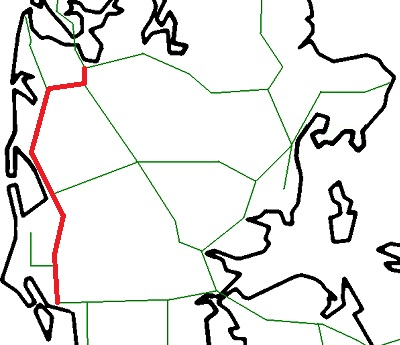

Overview
- Native name: Esbjerg–Struer Jernbane
- Owner: Banedanmark
- Termini: Esbjerg; Struer
- Stations: 23

Service
- Type: Railway
- System: Danish railway
- Operator(s): DSB; Arriva; Midtjyske Jernbaner

History
- Opened: Struer–Holstebro: 1 November 1866; Esbjerg–Varde: 3 October 1874; Holstebro–Ringkøbing: 31 March 1875; Varde–Ringkøbing: 8 August 1875

Technical
- Line length: 146.6 kilometres (91.1 mi)
- Number of tracks: Single
- Character: Passenger trains Freight trains
- Track gauge: 1,435 mm (4 ft 8 1/2 in)
- Electrification: None
- Operating speed: 120 km/h (Struer-Holstebro og Esbjerg-Varde); 100 km/h (Varde-Holstebro)
Route map
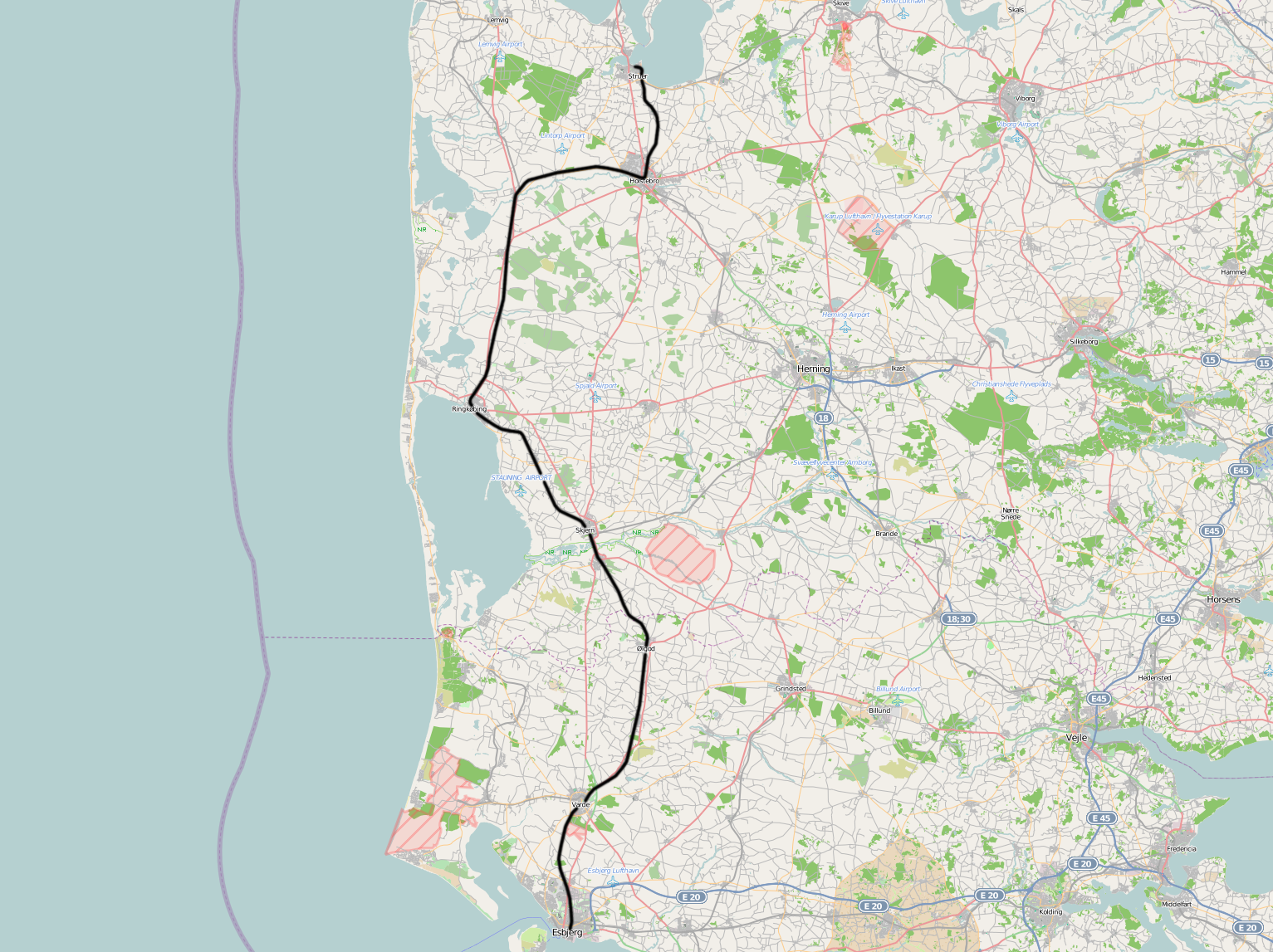

The Esbjerg–Struer railway line (Danish: Esbjerg–Struer banen), also known as the West Jutland longitudinal railway line (Danish: Den Vestjyske Længdebane) (Note: Although the Bramming–Tønder railway line and the Thy railway line are sometimes also considered part of the West Jutland longitudinal railway line), is a 146.6 kilometres (91.1 mi) long standard gauge single track railway line in Denmark which runs between the cities of Esbjerg and Struer in West Jutland, Denmark.

== History ==
The railway opened in sections from 1866 to 1875: the Struer–Holstebro section opened in 1866, the Esbjerg–Varde section opened in 1874, the Holstebro–Ringkøbing section opened in March 1875, and finally the Varde–Ringkøbing section opened in August 1875. The line is owned and maintained by Banedanmark and served with intercity, regional and local trains operated by the railway companies DSB, Arriva and Midtjyske Jernbaner.

In 2025, the section between Skjern and Holstebro was being refurbished for the operation of Siemens Mireo battery trains, which are heavy.
