= Lemvig Museum =

Museum in Denmark

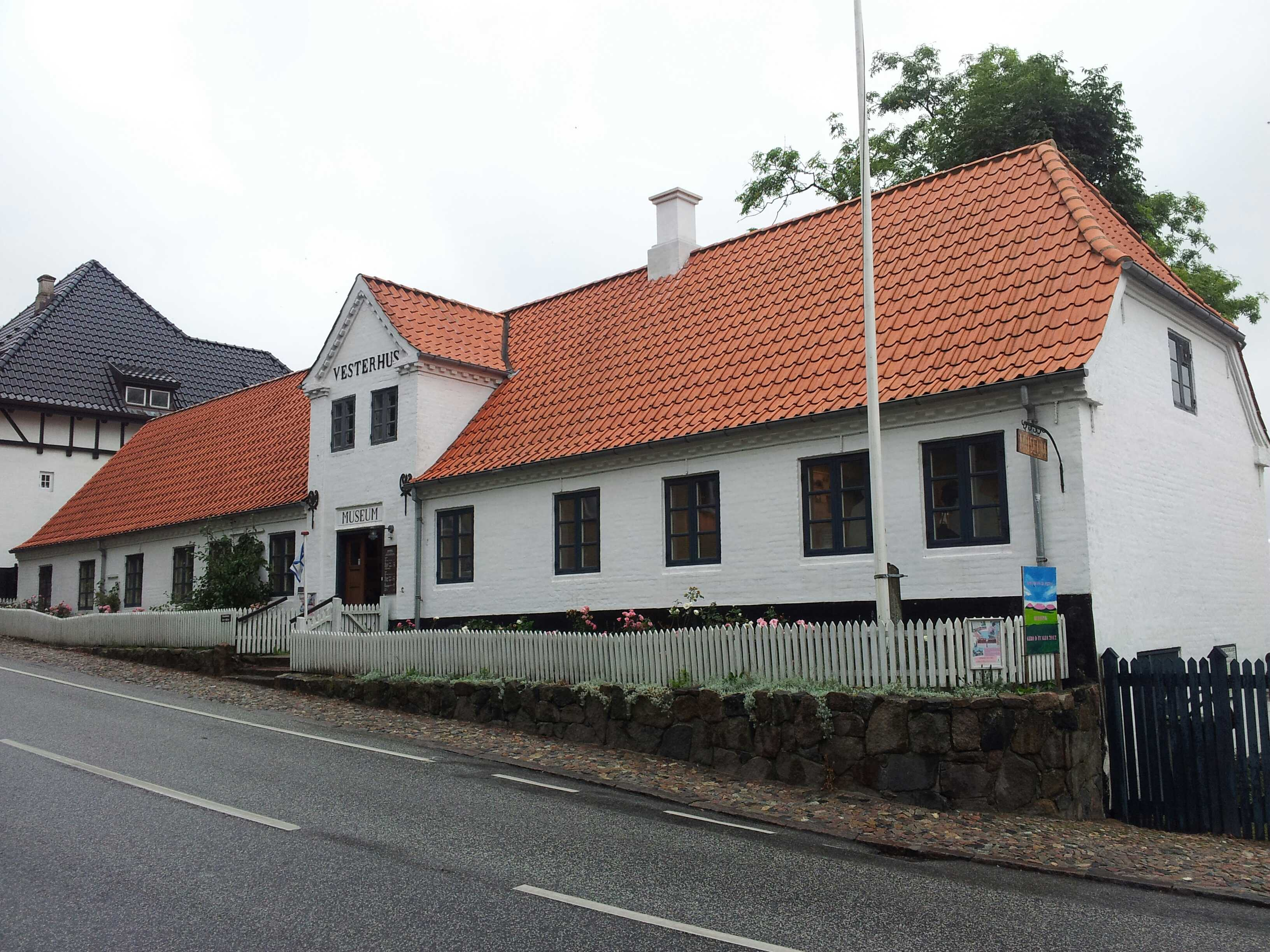
- Lemvig Museum
- Location: Lemvig, Denmark
- Coordinates: 56.5494°N 8.3018°E
- Type: Local museum

Lemvig Museum is a local museum in Lemvig, Denmark.

It has a number of exhibits about local points of interest, which is the subject of a major multimedia exhibition. Most notably is the exhibition of the Russian frigate Alexander Nevsky which wrecked in September 1868 on the coast between Harboøre and Thyborøn.

The museum features works by several local artists including sculptor Torvald Westergaard (1901-1988) and the painters Niels Bjerre (1864–1942), Kristen Bjerre (1869–1943) and Jens Søndergaard (1895-1957) presented at the museum. Also featured as part of the museum is the "Planetary Path," a trail which features a model of the Solar System at a 1 to 1 billion scale.

== See also ==
- Solar System model
