= Lemvig Municipality =

Lemvig Municipality Lemvig Kommune (Danish)
- Municipality
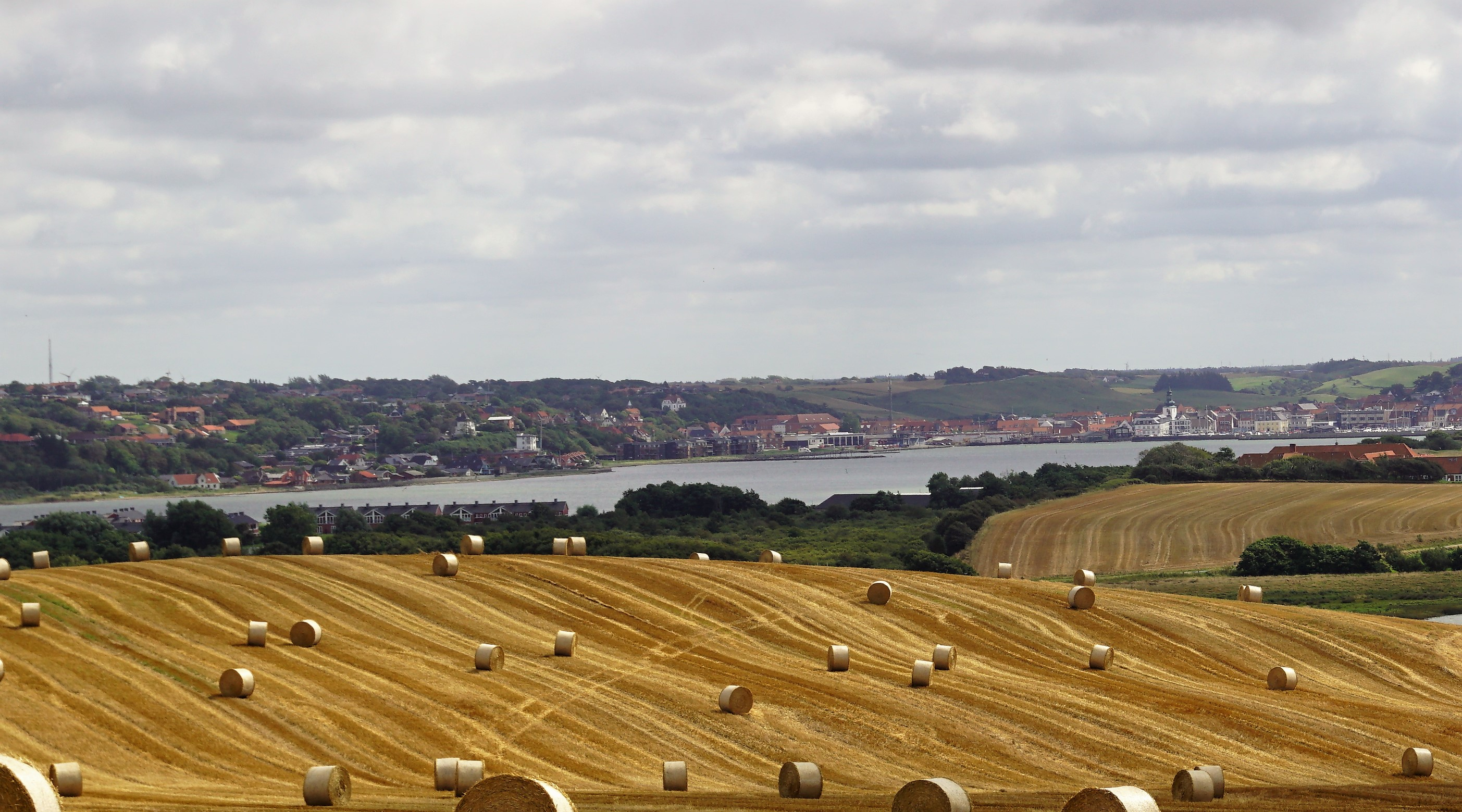

- Coat of arms

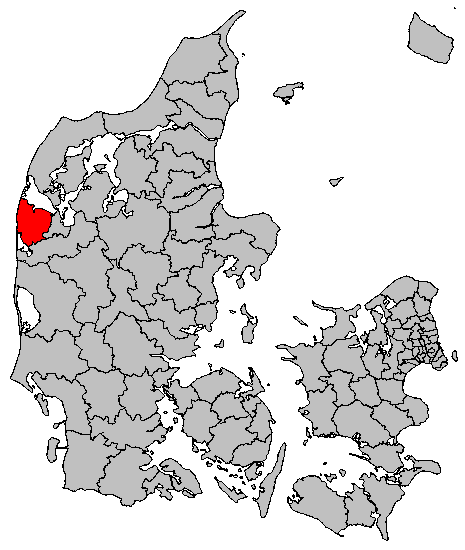
- Location of Lemvig municipality
- Coordinates: 56°32′00″N 8°18′00″E
- Country: Denmark
- Region: Midtjylland
- Established: 1 January 2007

Government
  - Mayor: Jens Lønberg (C)

Area
  - Total: 509.70 km^{2} (196.80 sq mi)

Population (1 January 2026)
  - Total: 18,596
  - Density: 36.484/km^{2} (94.494/sq mi)
- Time zone: UTC+1 (CET)
  - Summer (DST): UTC+2 (CEST)
- Website: lemvig.dk

Lemvig Municipality (Danish: Lemvig Kommune) is a municipality (Danish, kommune) in Region Midtjylland on the west coast of the Jutland peninsula in west Denmark. The municipality covers an area of 516.63 km^{2}, and has a population of 18,596 (2026). Its mayor is Erik Flyvholm, a member of the Venstre (Liberal Party) political party.

The main town and the site of its municipal council is the town of Lemvig. The town has a population of 6,966.

The current municipality was enlarged on 1 January 2007 as the result of Kommunalreformen ("The Municipal Reform" of 2007) when the former Thyborøn-Harboøre municipality was merged into the existing Lemvig municipality.

A significant part of its southern border is defined by the waters of Bøvling Fjord, Indfjorden and Nissum Fjord. A string of islands define the western perimeter of the waters south of the municipality; some of these islands belong to the municipality, and others belong to its southern neighbor, Ulfborg-Vemb. These waters at the municipality's southern border, encompassing the three fjords, plus Fejsted Kog is a national park.

The Lem Cove (Lem Vig) leads into the town of Lemvig from Nissum Bredning. Lake Ferring (Ferring Sø) lies north of the town of Ferring.

== Locations ==
The municipality was originally created in 1970 as the result of a kommunalreform ("Municipal Reform") that merged a number of existing parishes:

- Bøvling Parish
- Dybe Parish
- Fabjerg Parish
- Ferring Parish
- Fjaltring Parish
- Flynder Parish
- Gudum Parish
- Heldum Parish
- Hove Parish
- Hygum Parish
- Lemvig Parish
- Lomborg Parish
- Møborg Parish
- Nees Parish
- Nørlem Parish
- Nørre Nissum Parish
- Ramme Parish
- Rom Parish
- Trans Parish
- Tørring Parish
- Vandborg Nissum Parish

The four largest locations in the Municipality are:

Lemvig	6,900
Thyborøn	2,000
Harboøre	1400
Nørre Nissum	990

== Attractions ==
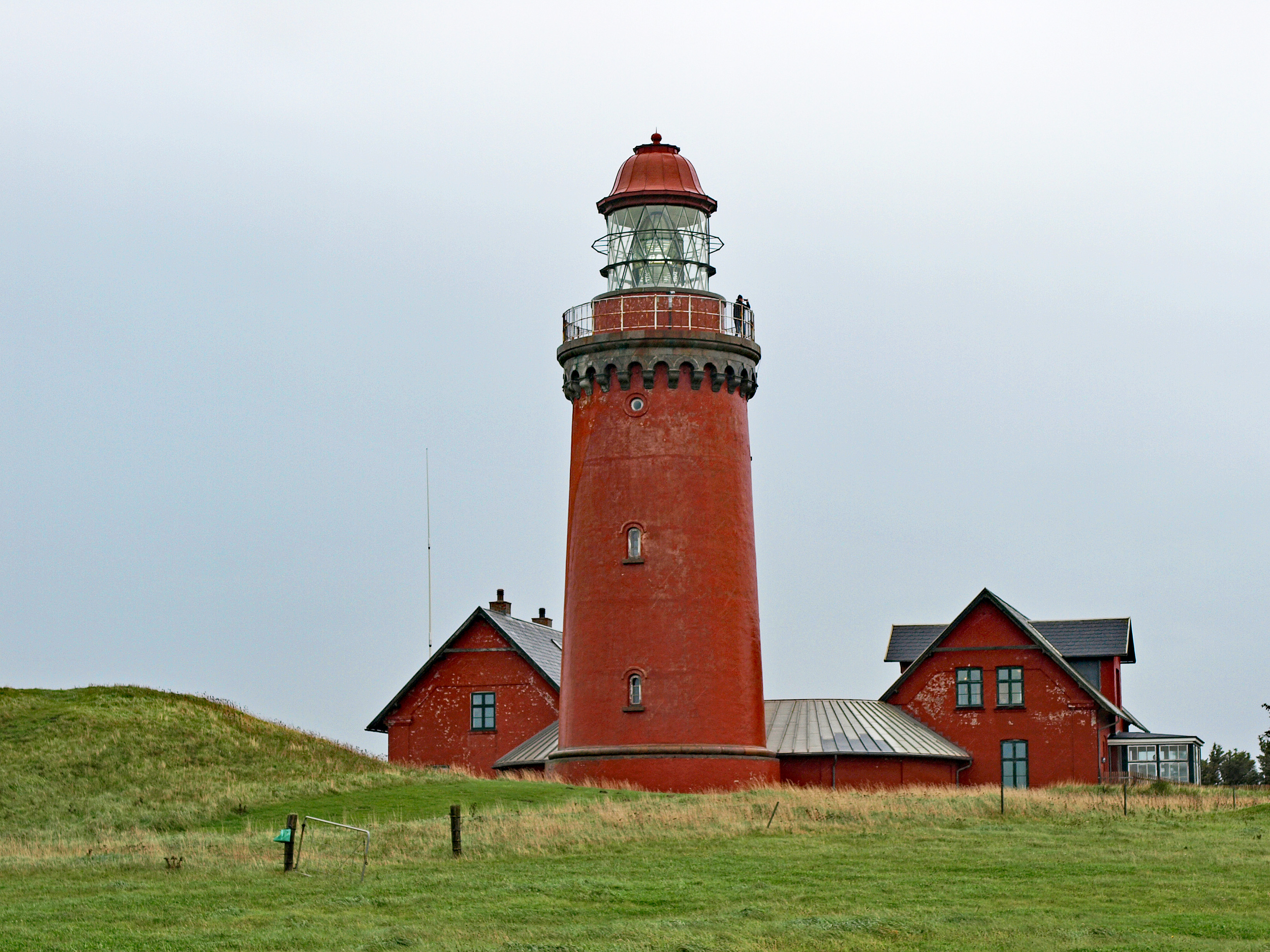
Bovbjerg Fyr.

- The museum of religious art (Museet for religiøs kunst)
- Bovbjerg Fyr, a light tower at the western coast near Ferring
- Ramme Dige
- Jens Søndergård Museum in Ferring
- Lemvig Museum in the town of Lemvig
- The planetstien ("planet trail") at the edge of Lemvig town shows a model of the Solar System at a scale of 1:1.000.000.000. The model of the Sun, 1.4 metres in diameter, is in a small park on the edge of town. The other planets follow along a path far out of town, represented as small bronze balls on granite pedestals. The outer planet, Pluto, is nearly 5 kilometres away from the Sun. The trail is part of the Lemvig Museum.

== Politics ==
=== Municipal council ===
Lemvig's municipal council consists of 21 members, elected every four years.

Below are the municipal councils elected since the Municipal Reform of 2007.

Election	Party									Total seats	Turnout	Elected mayor
Election	A	B	C	F	K	N	O	V	Æ	Total seats	Turnout	Elected mayor
2005	5		2	1	1	1		15		25	77.3%	Erik Flyvholm (V)
2009	4		3	3	1		2	8		21	74.9%	Erik Flyvholm (V)
2013	5		2	1			1	12		21	77.5%	Erik Flyvholm (V)
2017	4	1	1	2			1	12		21	76.7%	Erik Flyvholm (V)
2021	4	1	3	2				11		21	73.1%	Erik Flyvholm (V)
2025	4	1	2	1		1		6	4	21	76.6%	Jens Lønberg (C)
Data from Kmdvalg.dk 2005, 2009, 2013, 2017 and 2021. Data from valg.dk 2025

== Notable people ==
- Vilhelm Prior (1835 in at Mølgård in Vandborg Parish, west of Lemvig - 1910) a Danish book dealer and publisher
