= Listed buildings in Lemvig Municipality =

This is a list of listed buildings in Lemvig Municipality, Denmark.

== The list ==
Listing name	Contributing resource	Image	Location	Year built	source
Å Mølle	water mill		Remmerstrandvej 186, 7620 Lemvig	1839	665-41522-1
Å Mølle	Water tower		Remmerstrandvej 186, 7620 Lemvig	1839	665-41522
Flyvholm Redningsstation			Flyvholmvej 33, 7673 Harboøre	1934	665-978217-1
Rysensten	Manor house		Bøvlingvej 40A, 7650 Bøvlingbjerg	1539	665-67076-1
Sodborggård	Farmhouse		Sodborgvej 10, 7620 Lemvig	1846	665-23265-1
Stjernhjelms Hospital	Hospital		Kabbelvej 1, 7620 Lemvig	1780	665-273-3
Sønder Vinkel	Farmhouse		Lemvigvej 12, 7620 Lemvig	1838	665-54594-1
Tuskær Redningsstation	Farmhouse		Rubyvej 23, 7620 Lemvig	1834	665-38858-135
Lemvig Museum	Farmhouse		Vestergade 44, 7620 Lemvig	1841	665-1466-1
