= Vemb railway station =

Railway junction in West Jutland, Denmark

Vemb
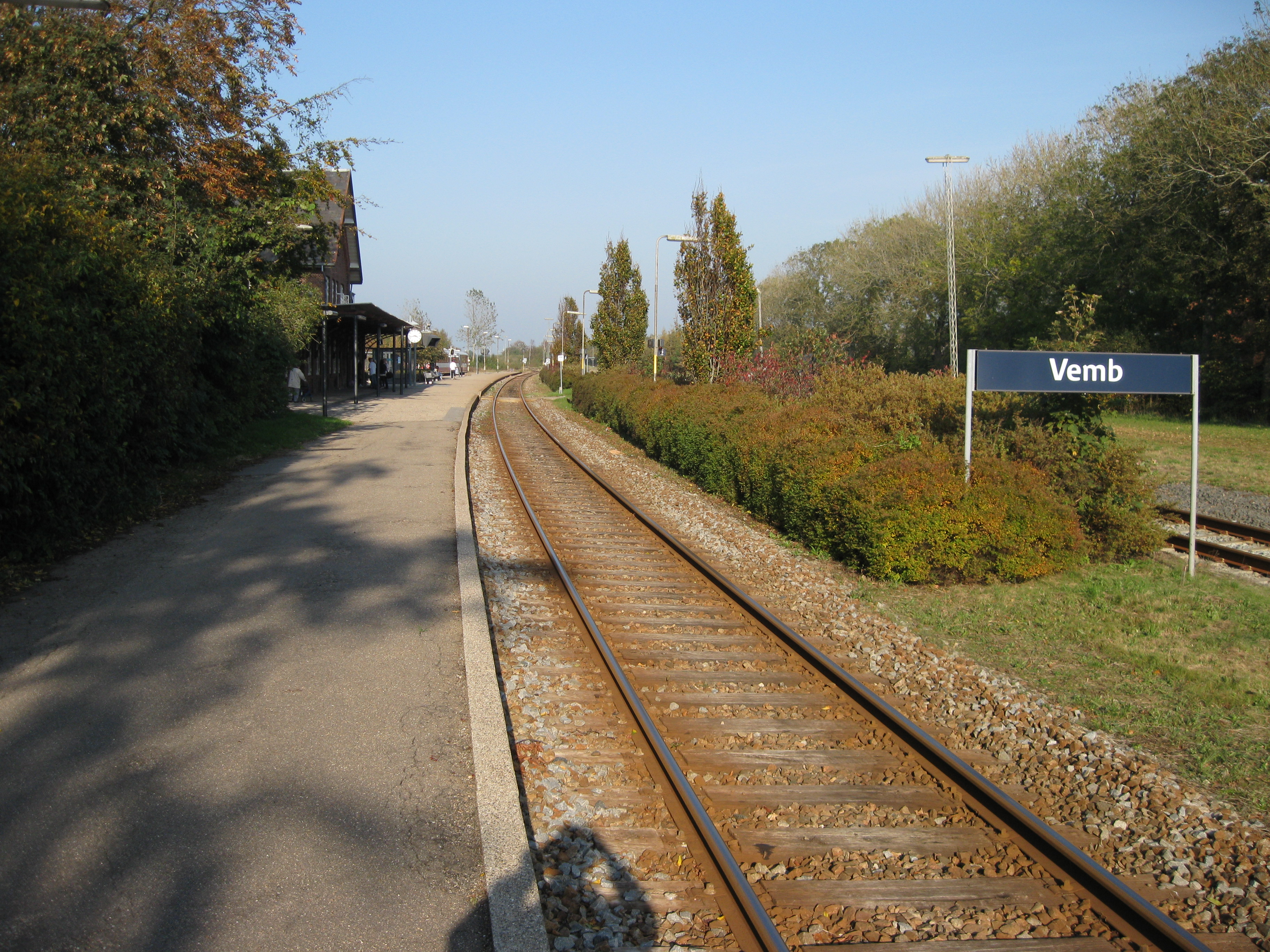
- Vemb station in 2010

General information
- Location: Stationsvej 6; 7570 Vemb; Holstebro Municipality; Denmark
- Coordinates: 56°20′38″N 8°20′44″E
- Elevation: 7.3 metres (24 ft)
- Owner: Banedanmark
- Lines: Esbjerg–Struer railway line; Lemvig Line
- Platforms: 2
- Tracks: 3
- Train operators: Midtjyske Jernbaner

History
- Opened: 31 March 1875

Services
Preceding station	Midtjyske Jernbaner	Following station
Ulfborg towards Skjern	Skjern–Holstebro Regional train	Bur towards Holstebro
Terminus	Vemb–Lemvig Local train	Amstrup towards Lemvig
Location

Vemb railway station is a railway station serving the small railway town of Vemb in West Jutland, Denmark.

Vemb station is located on the Esbjerg–Struer railway line from Esbjerg to Struer and is the southern terminus of the Lemvig railway line from Vemb to Thyborøn via Lemvig. The station opened in 1875. It offers regional rail services to Holstebro and Skjern, as well as local train services to Lemvig and Thyborøn, both operated by the railway company Midtjyske Jernbaner.

== History ==
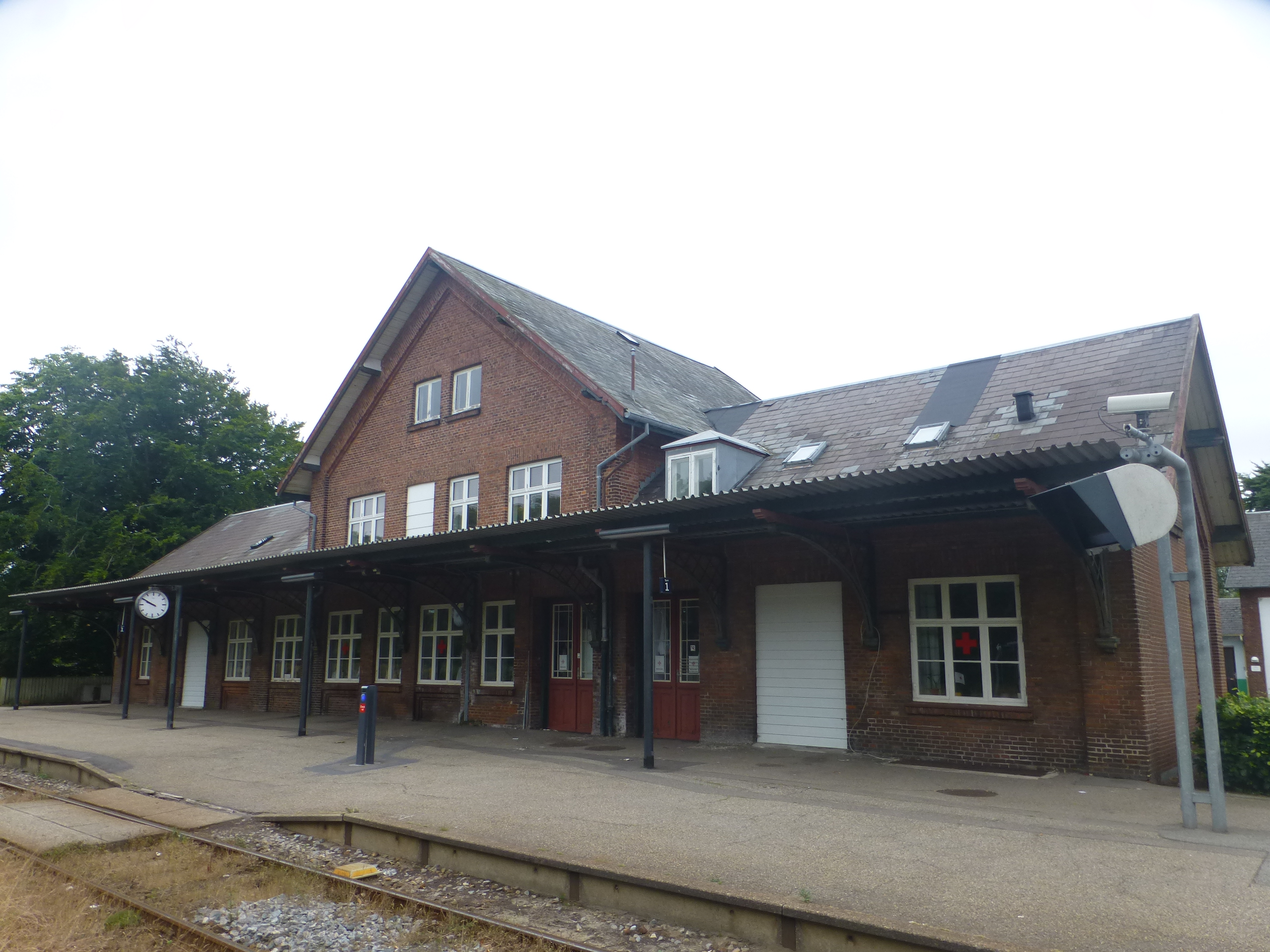
The station building in 2014.

The station opened on 31 March 1875 as the section from Holstebro to Ringkøbing of the new Esbjerg–Struer railway line opened.

In 1879, the station became the southern terminus of the new Lemvig railway line, which connected the market town of Lemvig with the Danish rail network. The Lemvig railway line was extended to Harboøre and Thyborøn in 1899.

== Services ==
The station offers direct regional rail services to Skjern and Holstebro, as well as local train services to Lemvig and Thyborøn, both operated by the regional railway company Midtjyske Jernbaner.

== See also ==
- List of railway stations in Denmark
- Rail transport in Denmark
