= Vemb =

- Town
- Location in Central Denmark Region Vemb (Denmark)
- Coordinates: 56°20′36″N 8°20′35″E
- Country: Denmark
- Region: Region Midtjylland
- Municipality: Holstebro Municipality

Area
  - Urban: 1.11 km^{2} (0.43 sq mi)

Population (2026)
  - Urban: 1,224
  - Urban density: 1,100/km^{2} (2,860/sq mi)
- Time zone: UTC+1 (CET)
  - Summer (DST): UTC+2 (CEST)
- Postal code: DK-7570 Vemb

Vemb is a little town in west Jutland, Denmark with a population of 1,224 (1 January 2026). The town is close to Nissum Fjord and Storå. Vemb also has a railway station on the railway line between Ringkøbing and Holstebro. Nørre Vosborg, a manor house surrounded by ramparts, is located 2 kilometers south of the town. It is one of Denmark's oldest manor houses and was mentioned as early as 1299. Vemb lies in Vemb Parish, which belongs to Holstebro Municipality in Region Midtjylland.

== History ==
The town's name has been known from 1325 and throughout the years up until 1844 has been spelled in 8–9 different ways:

- 1325 Weæm
- 1347 Weom
- 1350 Wæm
- 1360 Wææm
- 1500 Wern
- 1553 Weem
- 1561 Vem
- 1599 Wimb
- 1612 Vem Kirke > Vemb Kirke
- 1844 Vemb

The first time the town was named, it was called Weæm. The ending letter b emerged around the year 1600, disappeared, then finally appeared again in 1844 in the present spelling form Vemb. The meaning of Vemb is not known, but could possibly mean "vi" (Danish for "we").

The oldest building in the current city boundary is Vemb kirke (Vemb church), which has undergone few changes since it was built around 1200.

Just east of the church lies Den Gamle Skole ("The Old School"), now privately owned, that was the town and area's first school. It is said that in the late 1800s three women met on 1 April in the little school with one classroom. These three women would all reach the age of 100. In 1908 the current school was inaugurated near Burvej, called Vemb Skole (Vemb School): an entirely different school with central heating, a gymnasium (which later became a library) and a workshop. Vemb School has just had its 100-year anniversary jubilee, with 1000 former students in attendance.

Only when DSB opened the railway line from Holstebro to Ringkjøbing in 1875, was there passage through Vemb as a town, and when the Vemb-Lemvig railway line (VLTJ) arrived in 1879, Vemb suddenly became a railway hub. This provided the basis so that Gæstgivergaarden (travellers' inn) could be built, after which the town grew fairly quickly into a typical railway town.

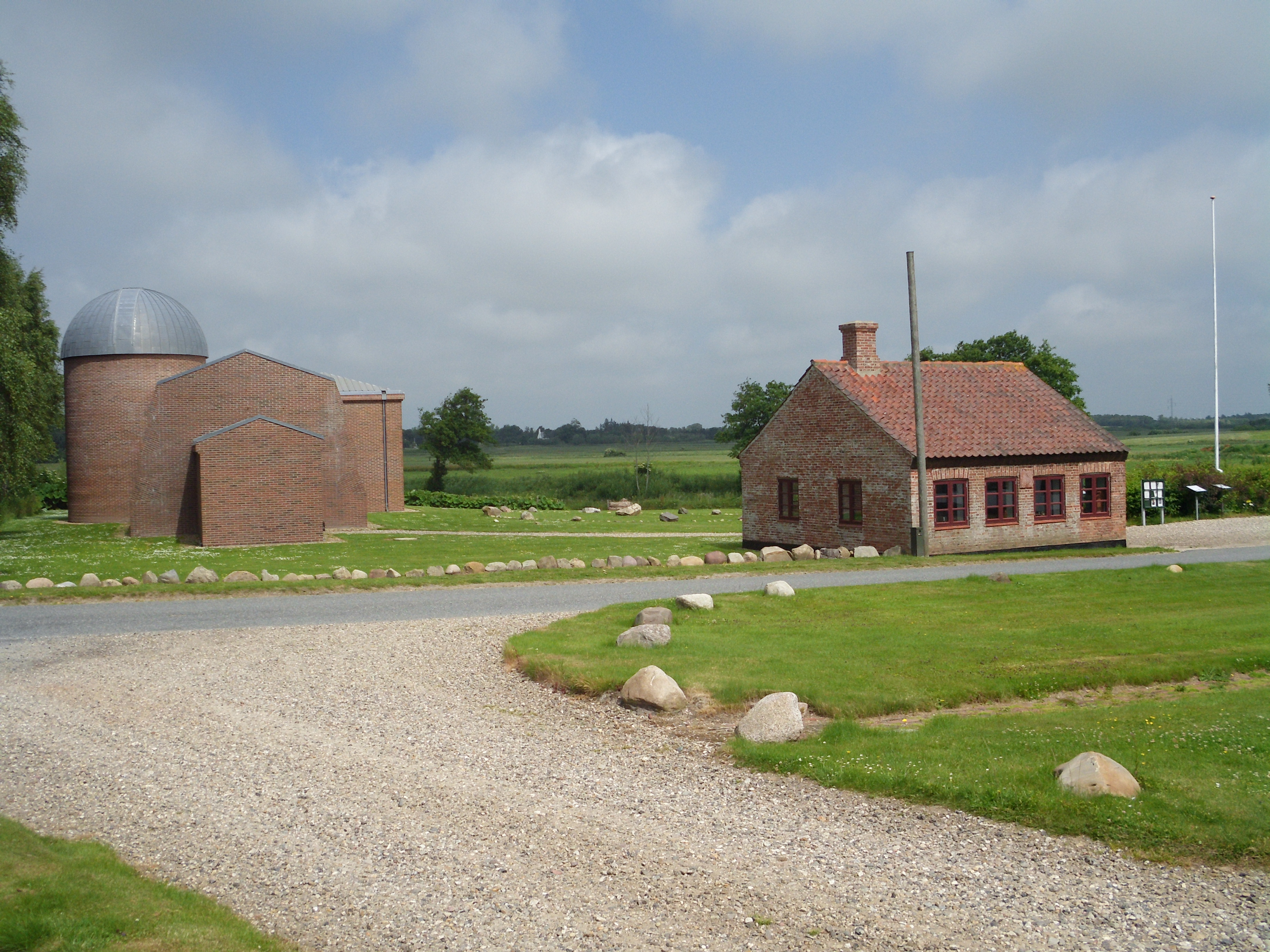
Astronomical observatory next to an old brick factory in Skærum mølle complex
