= Russian frigate Alexander Nevsky =

Screw frigate of the Russian Imperial Navy

Coordinates: 56°41′00″N 08°08′30″E

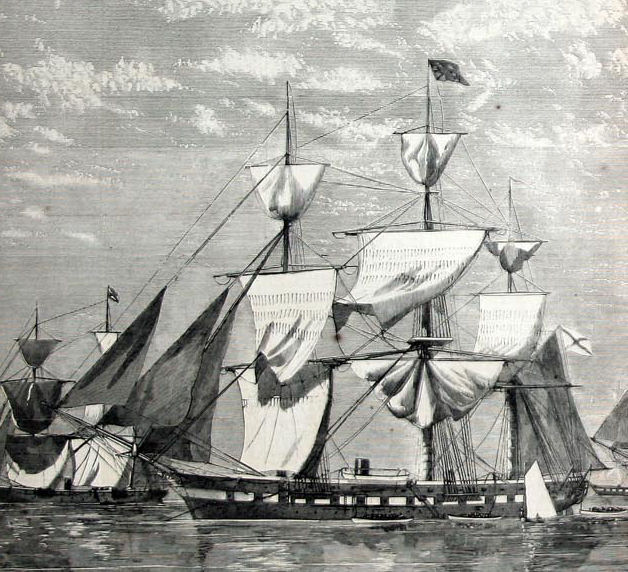
- Alexander Nevsky in New York Harbor, 1863. Detail from an illustration in Harper's Weekly.

History

Russian Empire
- Name: Alexander Nevsky; Александр Невский
- Namesake: Alexander Nevsky
- Builder: Okhtinskaya shipyard, Saint Petersburg
- Launched: 21 September 1861
- Completed: 14 June 1863
- Fate: Wrecked, 25 September 1868

General characteristics
- Type: 51-gun screw frigate
- Tons burthen: 5,100 bm
- Sail plan: Full-rigged ship
- Armament: 51 guns

Alexander Nevsky (Russian: Александр Невский) was a large screw frigate of the Russian Imperial Navy. The ship was designed as part of a challenge being offered by the Russian Empire to the Royal Navy, but was lost in a shipwreck in 1868 while Grand Duke Alexei, son of Tsar Alexander II, was aboard.

== History ==
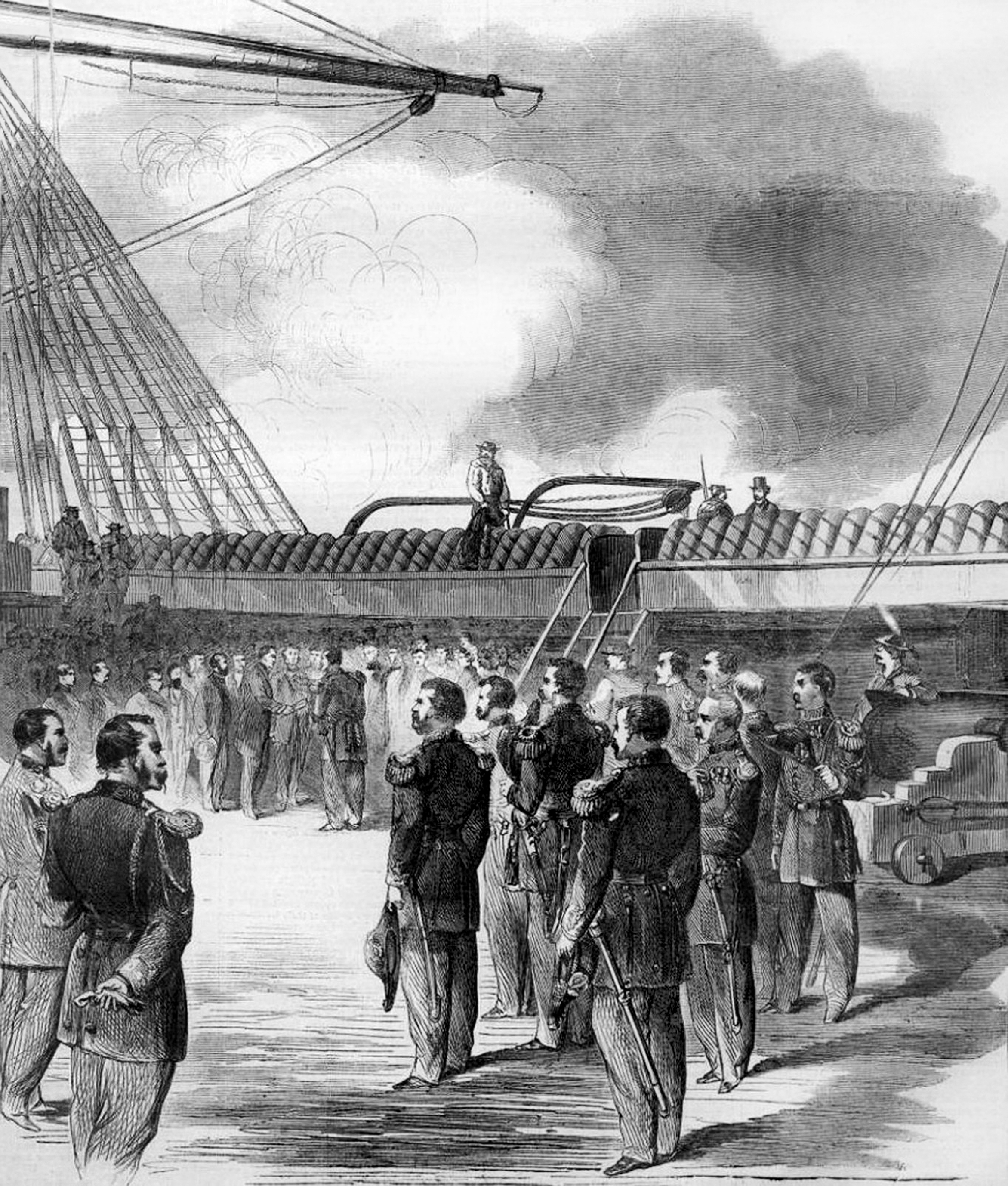
The American public visits the frigate Alexander Nevsky on arrival at Emigres. Illustration from Harpers Weekly for October 17, 1863

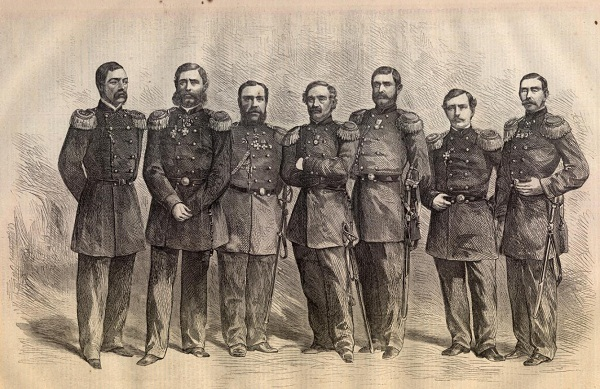
Captains Expedition Russian fleet to the shores of North America. From left to right: Pavel Zelenoy (clipper "Almaz"), I. I. Butakov (frigate "Ollyaby"), M. Fedorovsky (frigate "Alexander Nevsky"), Admiral S. Lesovsky (Commander of the Squadron), N. V. Kopatov (frigate "Peresvet"), O. K. Kremer, (Korvet "Vityaz"), R. A. Lund (Corvette " Varg ")

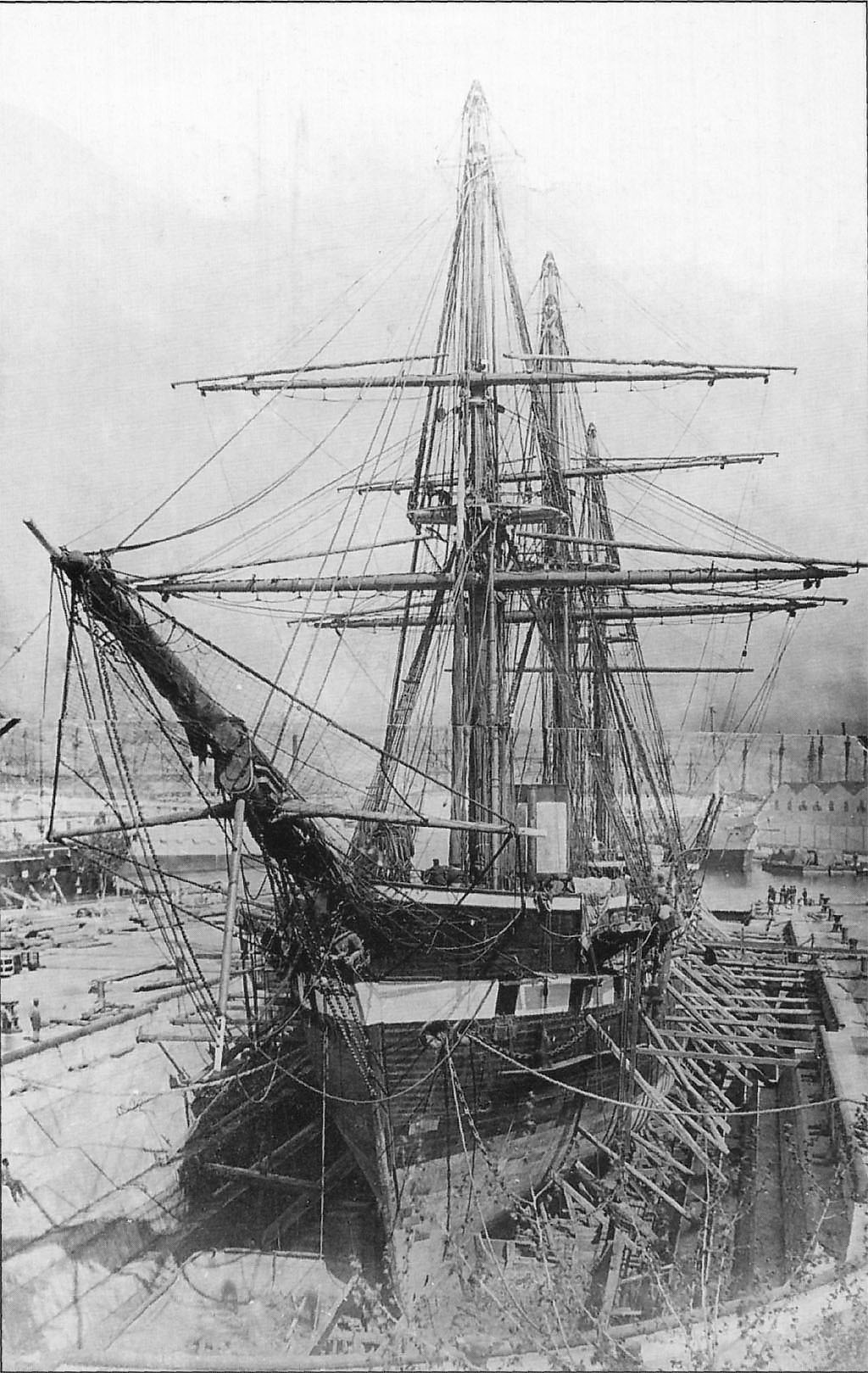
Alexander Nevsky, 1868, Toulon

Alexander Nevsky was a screw frigate of 5,100 tons (bm) and mounting 51 smoothbore cannon, making her a large vessel for her class. The ship's cannon were all 60-pounder smoothbores, divided into long- and medium-class guns.

The vessel was part of the expansion of the Russian Imperial Navy in cooperation with the United States, in order to challenge then-rival Great Britain's Royal Navy. The ship was designed by Ivan Dmitriev based on the frigate General Admiral, an American-made ship ordered by the Russian Imperial Navy prior to the American Civil War. It was named after Russian historical icon Alexander Nevsky (1230–1263), making it the seventh warship at the time that had carried his name.

Once commissioned, the vessel was part of the Atlantic Squadron of Rear Admiral Stepan Lesovsky. In 1863, Lesovsky sailed the Atlantic Squadron, using Alexander Nevsky as his flagship, to New York City in order to show the flag during a low point in American-Russian relations. The ship's captain at the time was Captain Mikhail Yakovlevich Federovsky.

The fleet's American design was noted with enthusiasm by American spectators. For instance, it was noted in Harper's Weekly that:

The two largest in the squadron, the frigate Alexander Nevski and Peresvet, are evidently vessels of modern build, and much about them leads the unpracticed eye to think they were built in this country ... The flagship's guns are of American make, being cast in Pittsburgh.

Alexander Nevsky and the other vessels of the Atlantic squadron stayed in American waters for seven months, despite the state of civil war then existing in the United States. They even dropped anchor at Washington, D.C., the ships having sailed up the Potomac River. At one point during this extended stay, Alexander Nevsky had engine problems during a local cruise and had to return to New York for repairs.

== Shipwreck ==
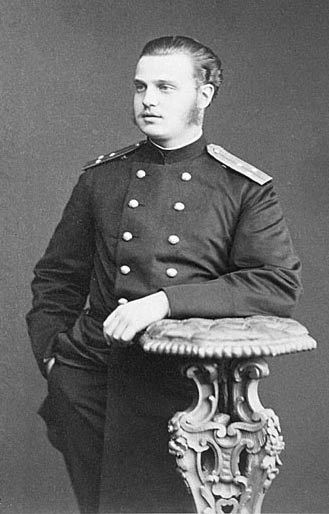
Grand Duke Alexei Alexandrovich in his youth, photo by Sergei Lvovich Levitsky

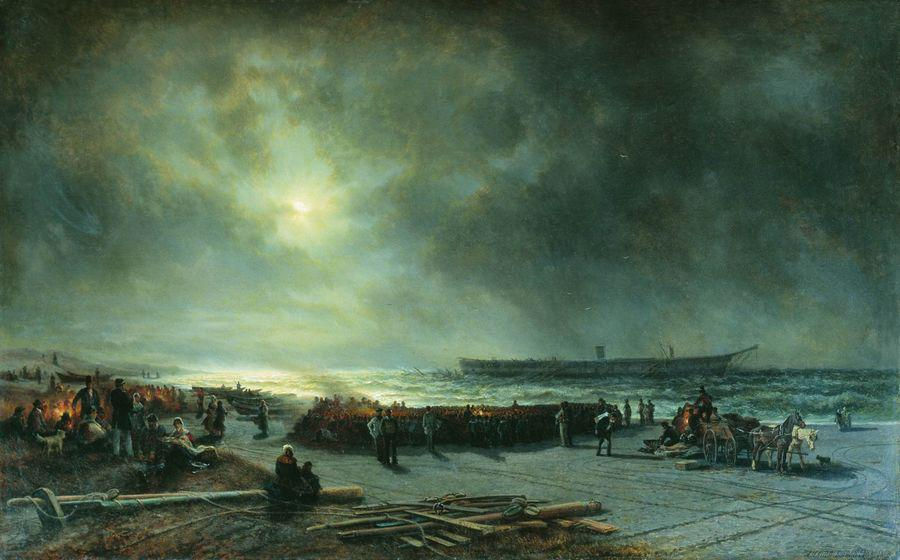
Wreck of the Alexander Nevsky by artist Alexey Bogolyubov, 1868

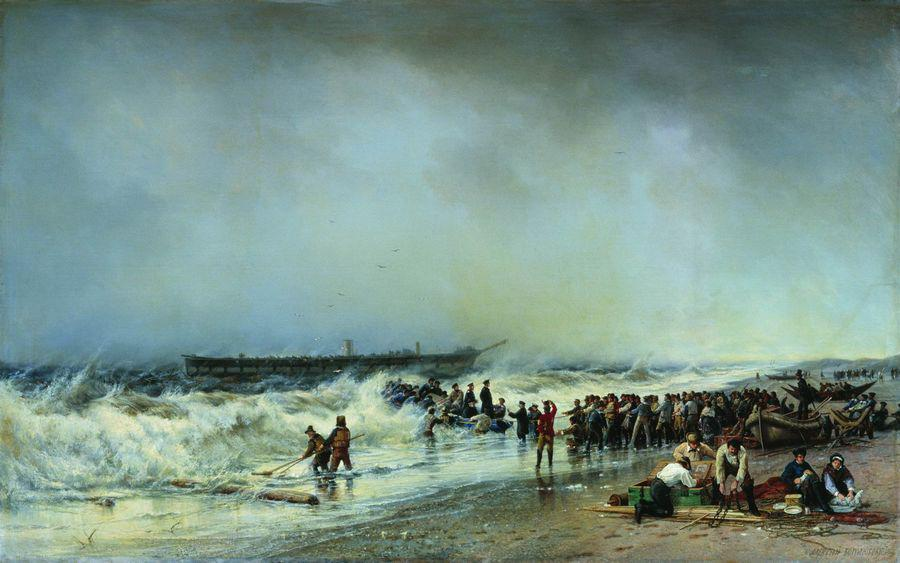
Second painting by Bogolyubov, 1868

On 25 September 1868, on her way home from a visit to Piraeus, where she had participated in the celebration of Greek King George's wedding to Grand Duchess Olga of Russia, and while carrying Grand Duke Alexei, son of Tsar Alexander II, Alexander Nevsky was wrecked in the North Sea off Thyborøn, a fishing village in Jutland, Denmark.

The vessel was travelling by sail at that time and both the admiral (who had been responsible for Grand Duke Alexei's naval education) and the ship's captain miscalculated the ship's position due to incorrect drift information recorded in the pilot book. Buffeted by rain, Alexander Nevsky struck a sandbar, and her masts and some of the ship's cannons had to be pitched into the sea to prevent the vessel from immediately capsizing.

Responding to the ship's distress signal (a gun was fired), the local fishermen poured out into the now becalmed sea and rescued all of the ship's crew, aside from five crewmen who had drowned while attempting to seek help on a lifeboat.

The warship eventually sank, the wreck settling in roughly 60 feet (20 m) of water, only 300 feet (100 m) from the present coast of Thyborøn. The captain and admiral aboard were convicted of dereliction of duty at a court-martial, but the tsar intervened and pardoned them due to their long service to the fleet.

Grand Duke Alexei often claimed that he almost drowned when the ship went down, and enjoyed telling the story through the rest of his life.

== Legacy ==
The shipwreck was the topic of a great deal of local and international reporting at the time, and is the subject of a major exhibition at the "Kystcentret" in Thyborøn.

Three of the drowned crewmen were buried in the village churchyard, while the remains of the two others were returned to Russia. There is a small tombstone for the three buried there (officer Odintsov and crewmen Shilov and Polyakov) with the inscription, "They risked their lives to save other people. In the name of our Lord peace over them."

Russian writer Pyotr Vyazemsky, who had been aboard Alexander Nevsky in 1865 in Nice, dedicated a poem to the ship. Artist Alexey Bogolyubov created two paintings of the ship's fate, one depicting the wreck during the night and the other during daylight.

One of the ship's anchors is on display outside Harboøre's church, another in Thyborøn.

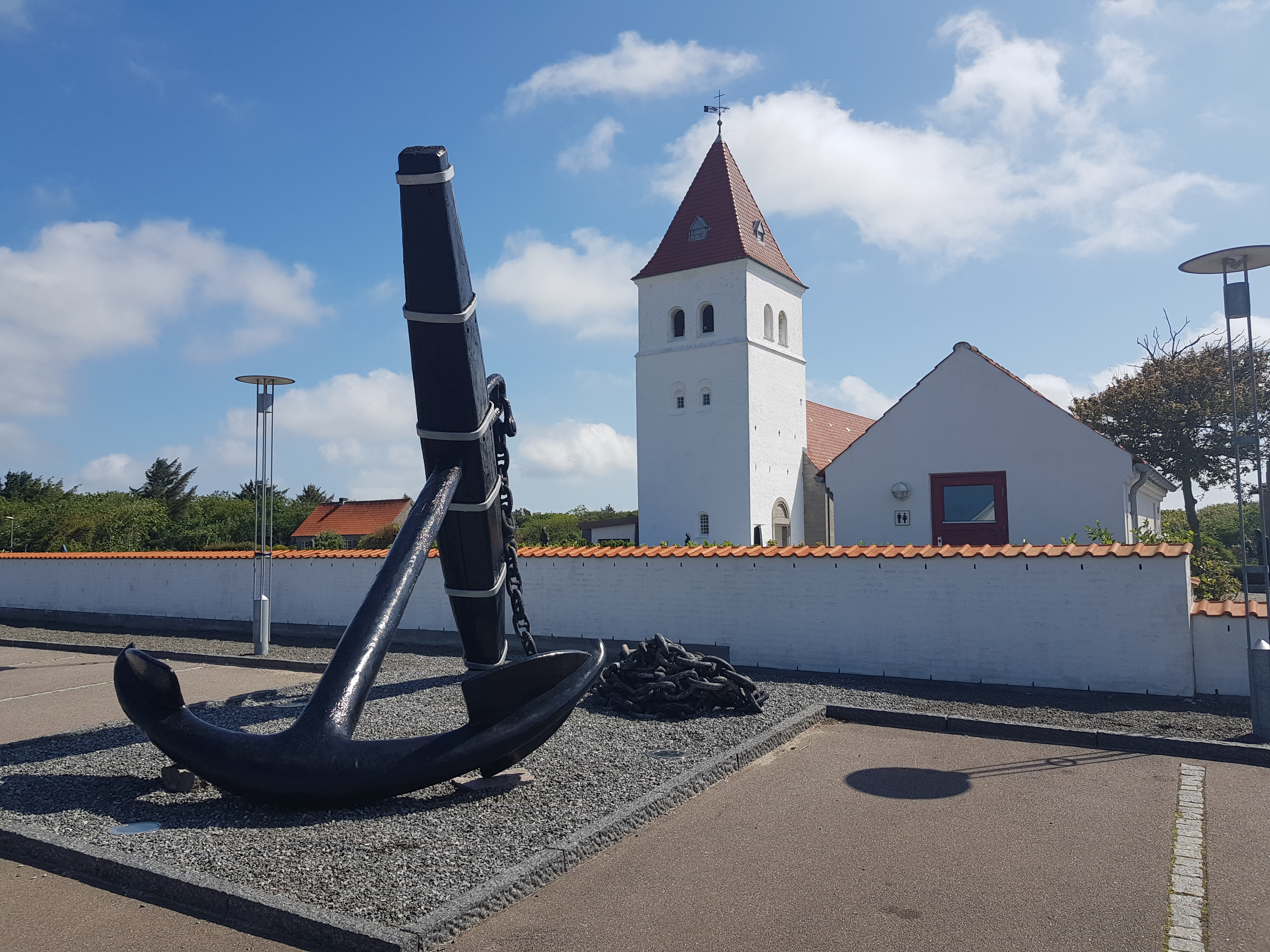
Alexander Nevsky anchor in Harboøre

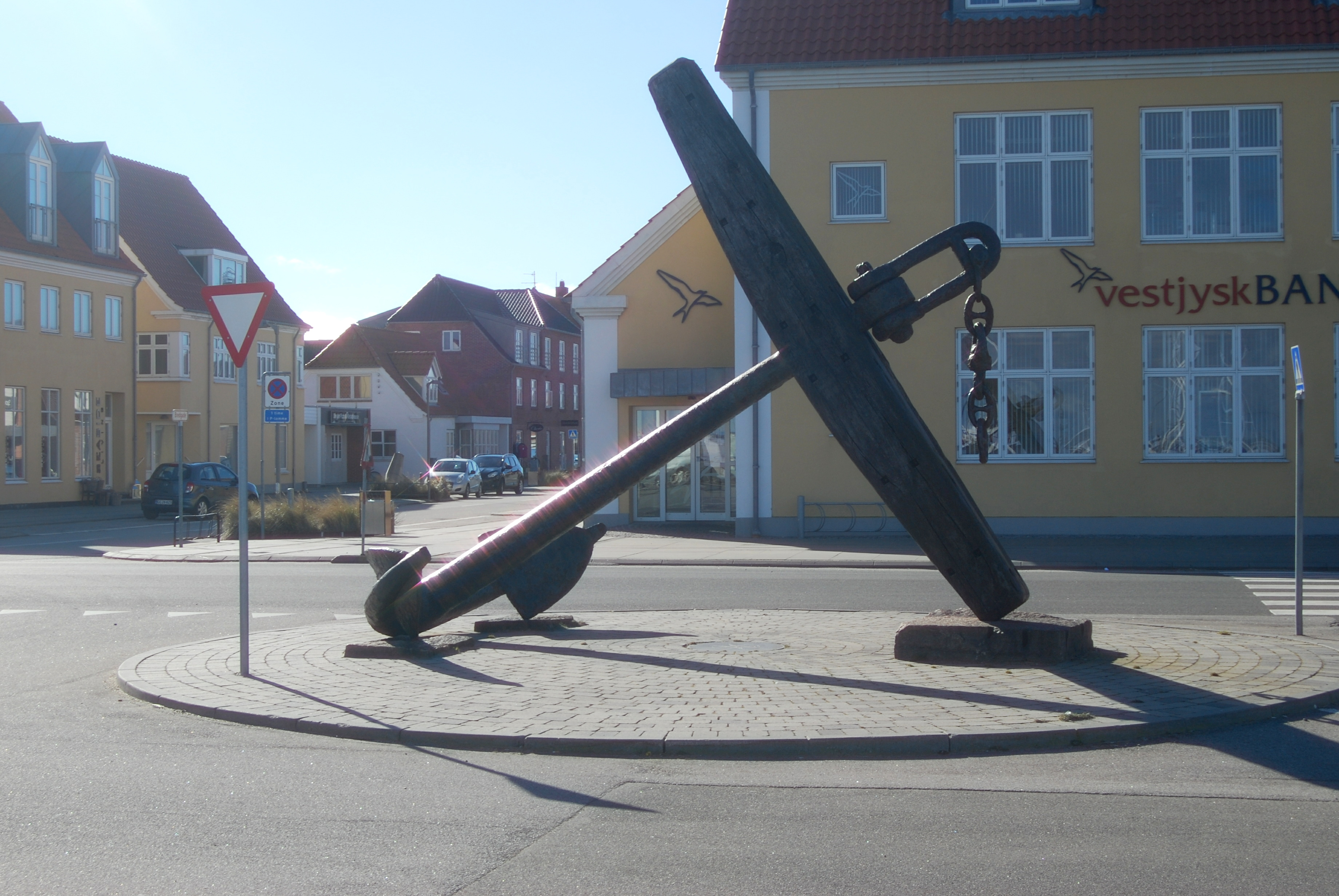
Alexander Nevsky anchor in Thyborøn

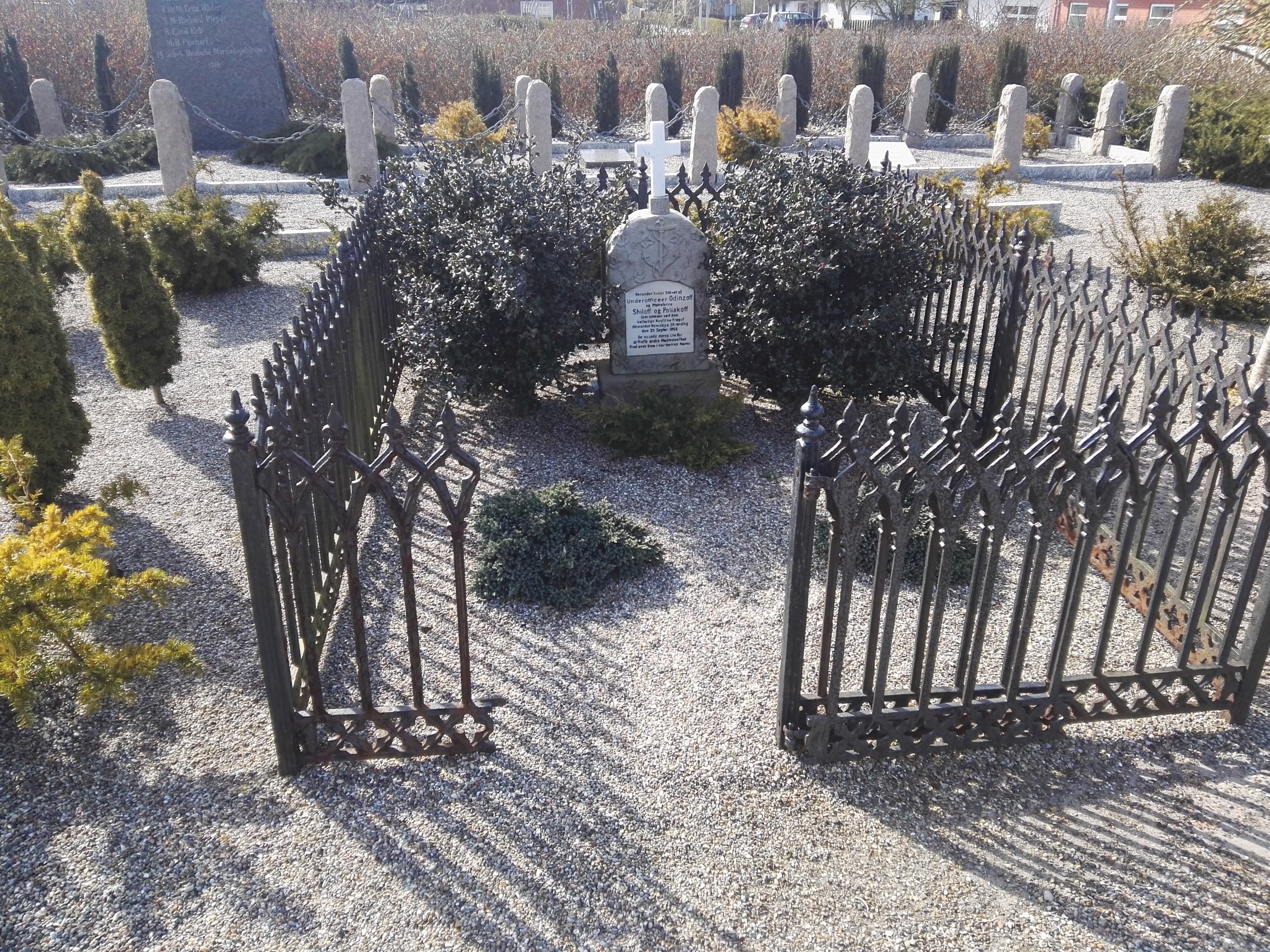
The grave of the 3 crewmen at Harboøre Church
