= Max Rasmussen =

Danish footballer (born 1945)

Personal information
- Full name: Max Kiel Rasmussen
- Date of birth: 11 December 1945 (age 80)
- Place of birth: Lemvig, Denmark
- Height: 1.74 m (5 ft 9 in)

Senior career*
Years	Team	Apps	(Gls)
1969–1970	Herning Fremad		
1970–1973	Akademisk Boldklub		
1973–1974	Vejle Boldklub		

International career
1972	Denmark	5	(0)
- * Club domestic league appearances and goals

Max Kiel Rasmussen (born 11 December 1945) is a Danish former footballer who played as a midfielder. He competed with the Denmark national team in the men's tournament at the 1972 Summer Olympics.
