= Thyborøn-Harboøre Municipality =

Former municipality in Denmark

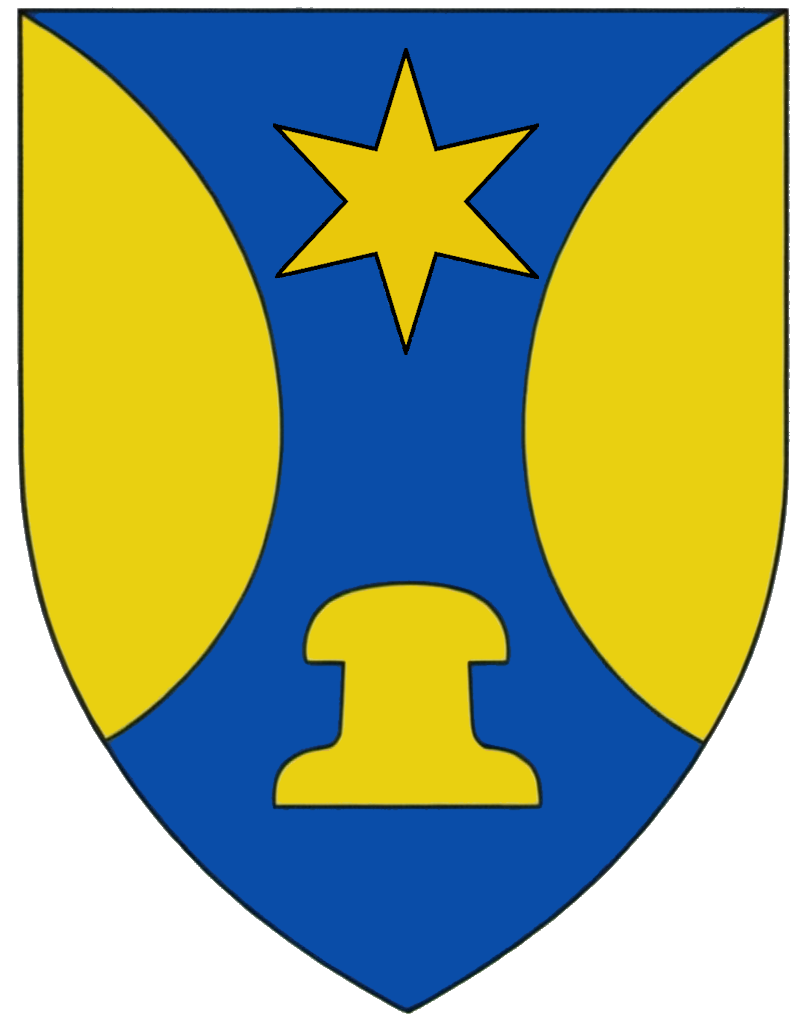
Coat of arms of Thyborøn-Harboøre Municipality

Until 1 January 2007 Thyborøn-Harboøre was a municipality (Danish, kommune) in the former Ringkjøbing County on the west coast of the Jutland peninsula in west Denmark. The municipality covered an area of 42 km^{2}, and had a total population of 4,690 (2005). Its last mayor was Erik Flyvholm.

The main town and the site of its municipal council was the town of Thyborøn.

To the east are the waters of Nissum Bredning, a large body of water connected to the North Sea, which lies directly to the west of the former municipality. The waters of the North Sea enter the Nissum Bredning through the Thyborøn Channel (Thyborøn Kanal), which lie directly to the north of the former municipality, and which separate it from Sydthy municipality to the north. The Nissum Bredning is the westernmost part of the Limfjord (Limfjorden), a shallow sound that separates the island of Vendsyssel-Thy to the north of the former municipality from the rest of the Jutland Peninsula.

Thyborøn-Harboøre municipality ceased to exist as the result of Kommunalreformen ("The Municipality Reform" of 2007). It was merged into Lemvig Municipality. This created a municipality with an area of 510 km^{2} and a total population of 22,760 (2005). The new municipality belongs to Central Denmark Region (Region Midtjylland).
