= Sea War Museum Jutland =

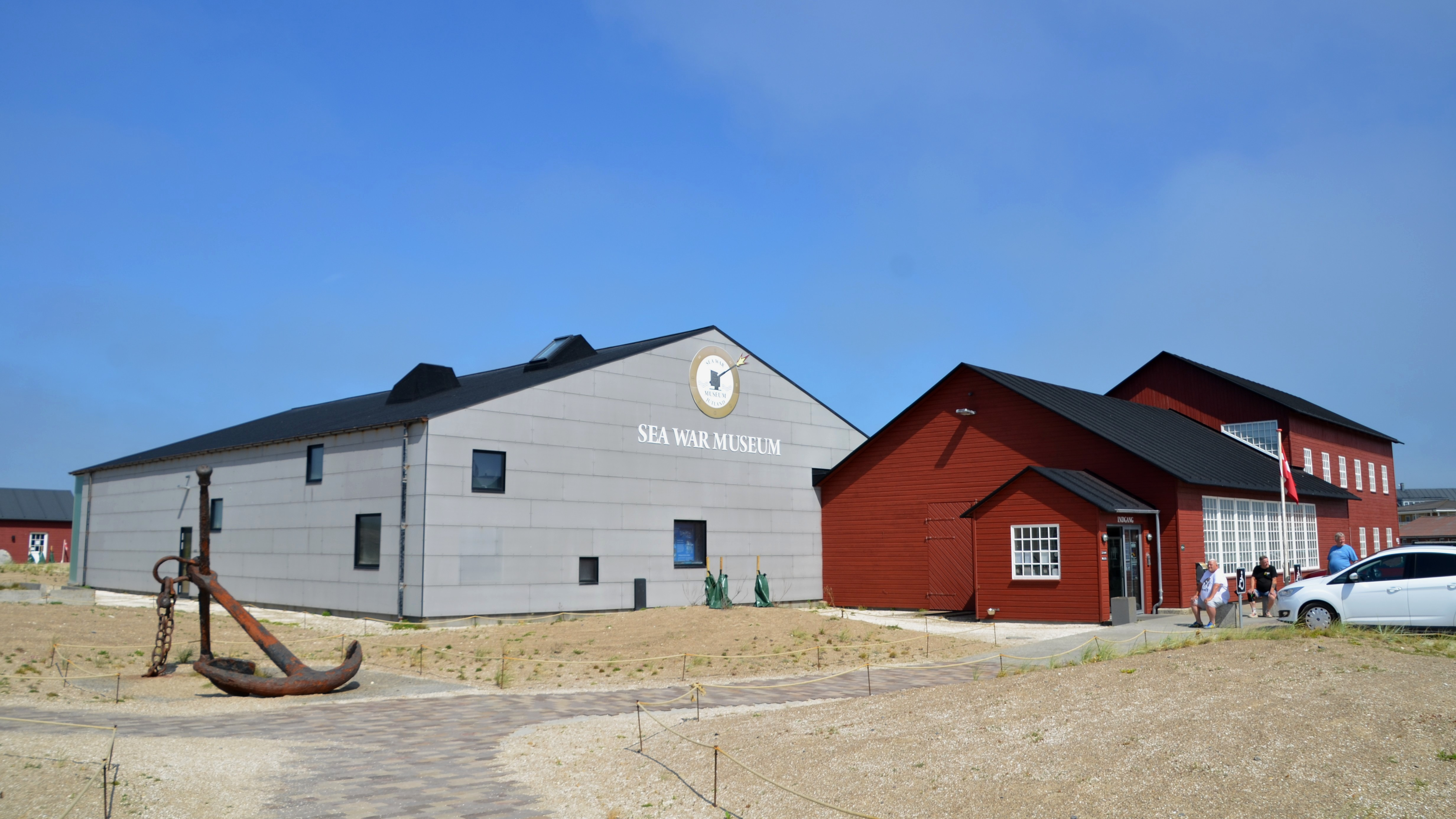
The Sea War Museum

The Sea War Museum Jutland is a war museum in Thyborøn, Jutland, Denmark. It was founded by Gert Normann Andersen and was opened on am 15 September 2015. It is about the Battle of Jutland, which took place during World War I, on 31 May 1916. Attached to the museum is the Jutland Memorial Park, which commemorates the 8,645 sailors from both the United Kingdom and Germany who died in the battle.

== Museum exhibitions ==
The museum includes the following:

- British and German U-boats
- The Battle of Jutland
- The Battle of Heligoland Bight
- The Battle of Dogger Bank
- The air war over the North Sea
- RMS Lusitania and U-20 exhibition
- Seamine exhibition
- Torpedo exhibition
- Marine archaeology

The Sea War Museum Jutland not only tells the story about the Battle of Jutland but also about four years of war, which was fought on, above and below the surface of the sea. It was four brutal years with submarines and zeppelins, with mine war and destroyer war, with trade war and cruiser war. Men fought and died in the cold waves of the North Sea, and in reality, the war might have been decided here. Whoever controlled the sea-lanes to England would also win the war, and the North Sea consequently came to play a crucial role.

The museum also holds some artifacts from the German U-boat U-20, which was famous for its role in the sinking of the Lusitania. The U-20 ran aground near the Danish coast and the conning tower of the U-20 is now on display at the Sea War Museum.

== War memorial ==
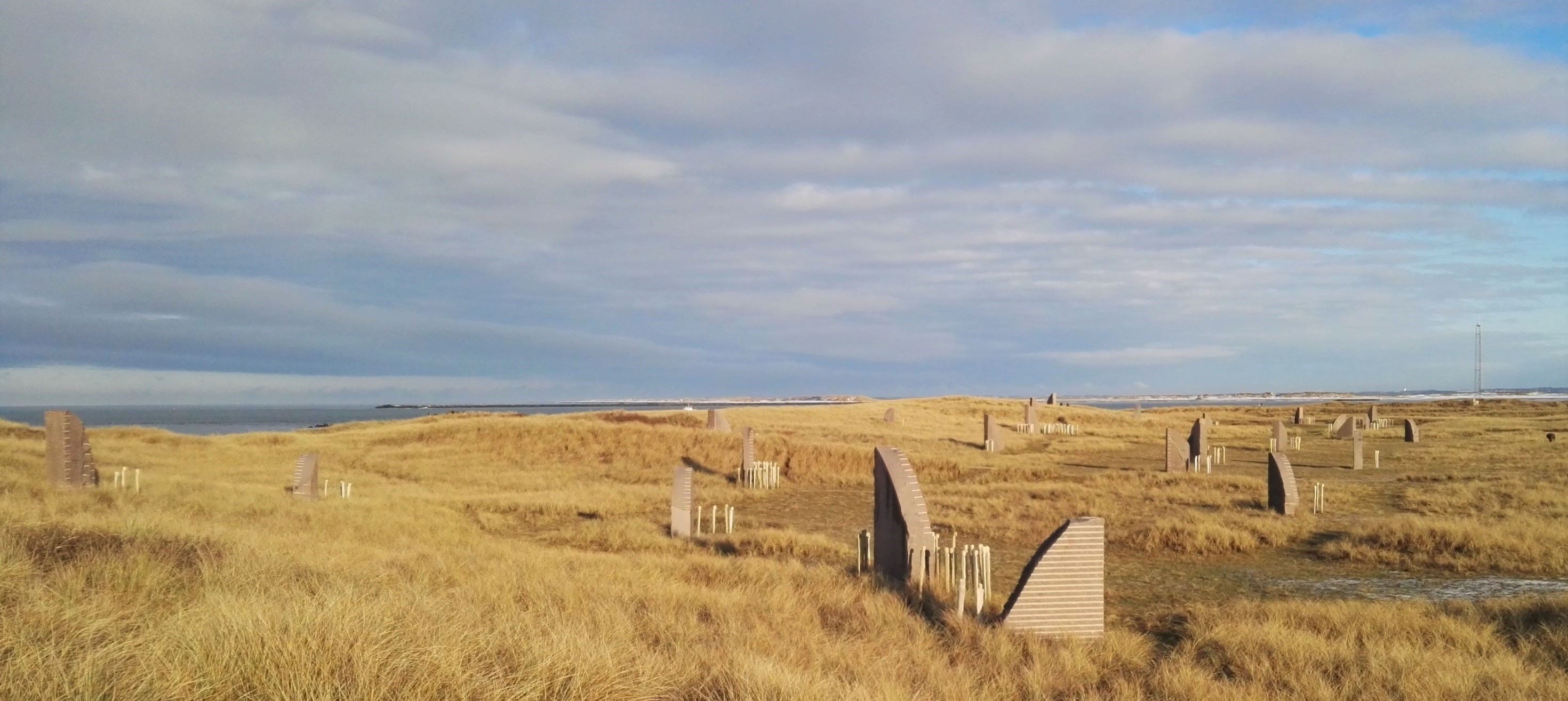
The Memorial Park

Jutland Memorial Park is a memorial park in Thyborøn, Jutland, Denmark.

One of the world's largest sea battles took place between 31 May and 1 June 1916 during World War I. 250 warships were engaged in battle, in this test of strength between the British Royal Navy and the German Kaiserliche Kriegsmarine. 25 ships were sunk during the battle and more than 8,600 sailors lives were lost.

The goal of this memorial park is to bring its victims to light and to remember those who died during the battle. In doing so, this will create one of the largest war memorial, located on the west coast of Jutland close to where the battle took place.

The memorial consist of 26 granite blocks, which commemorates each ship sunk in the battle, and one for casualties on other ships. Currently, As of 12 August 2018 300 white statues makes the death of the sailors. In the future, the hope is to raise the necessary funding to have 8,645 statues, one for each sailor.

The memorial was opened on the day of the hundredth anniversary of the battle. The event was hosted by the Royal Navy Admiral John Jellicoe's grandson, Nicolas Jellicoe, and by Kaiserliche Kriegsmarines Vice Admiral Reinhard Scheer's great-grandson, Reinhard Scheer.

== Bibliography ==
- Jakobsen, Knud (2007). Jyllandsslaget og første verdenskrig i Nordsøen (in Danish). Sea War Museum Jutland. ISBN 9788799977901.
