= Jens Søndergaard =

Danish expressionist painter (1895–1957)

Jens Søndergaard (4 October 1895 – 21 May 1957) was a Danish expressionist painter. He specialised in strongly coloured landscapes depicting his feelings for the power of nature and the sea. Søndergaard won both national and international acclaim.

== Biography ==
Jens Andersen Søndergaard was born in the small town Øster Assels on the island of Mors. His father, Anders Søndergaard, was a painter, but later opened a bicycle shop in Hurup on Thy. After finishing school, Jens Søndergaard also began training as a painter. After having served his apprenticeship, he was admitted to the technical school in Aarhus. While he worked as a painter, he tried to break through as an artist. He succeeded rather quickly, and was admitted to the Royal Danish Academy of Fine Arts in Copenhagen in 1916, where his teacher was Malthe Engekstad.

In 1919, Jens Søndergaard debuted at the annual Artists Autumn Exhibition (Kunstnernes Efterårsudstilling) and hosted his own separate exhibition the following year. In 1926, he traveled to Paris, southern France and Italy. The same year, he became a member of the Danish artists cooperative Grønningen, and exhibited his works there until his death. In 1931, he received the Eckersberg Medal and in 1946 the Thorvaldsen Medal. Søndergaard died at Skovshoved and was buried at Ordrup Cemetery.

== Jens Søndergaards Museum ==
Many of Søndergaard's works can be seen at the Jens Søndergaard Museum, a part of Lemvig Museum at Lemvig on the west coast of Jutland. Once his own summer residence and atelier, the small wooden house lies right at the coast to the North Sea.

== See also ==
- Art of Denmark
