= Harboøre =

- Town
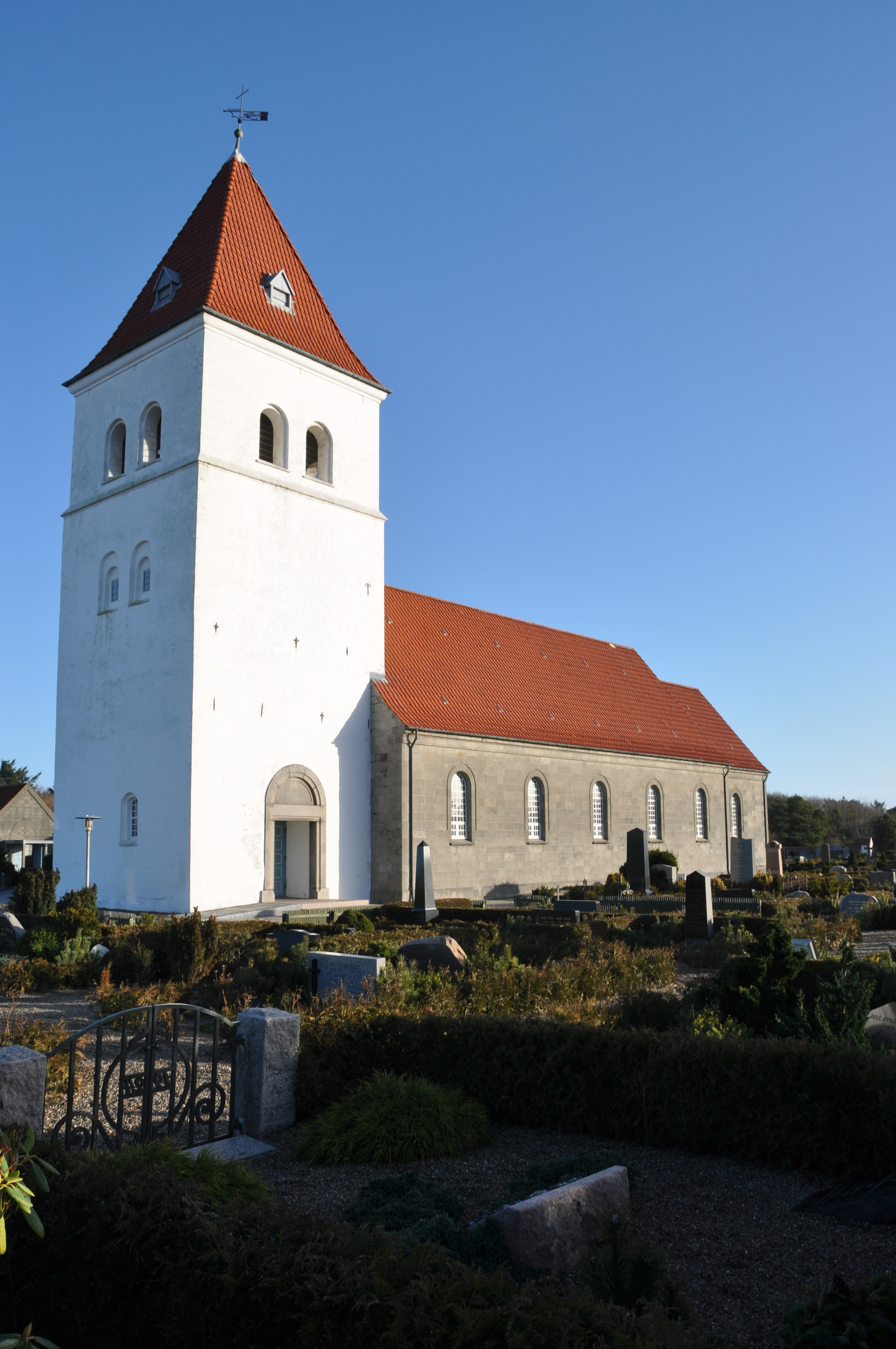
- Harboøre Church

- Location in Denmark Harboøre (Central Denmark Region)
- Coordinates: 56°37′10″N 8°10′44″E
- Country: Denmark
- Region: Central Denmark (Midtjylland)
- Municipality: Lemvig Municipality

Area
  - Urban: 1.1 km^{2} (0.42 sq mi)

Population (2026)
  - Urban: 1,314
  - Urban density: 1,200/km^{2} (3,100/sq mi)
- Time zone: UTC+1 (CET)
  - Summer (DST): UTC+2 (CEST)
- Postal Code: DK-7673 Harboøre

Harboøre is a railway town, with a population of 1,314 (1 January 2026), in Lemvig Municipality, Central Denmark Region in Denmark. It is located 11 km south of Thyborøn, 46 km northwest of Holstebro and 14 km northwest of Lemvig.

Harboøre is situated at the south end of the narrow peninsula and former isthmus of Harboøre Tange between the North Sea and Nissum Bredning.

It is served by Harboøre railway station on the Lemvig railway line.

Harboøre Church is located in the town.
