= Nissum Bredning =

Protected area in Denmark

Coordinates: 56°38′N 8°19′E

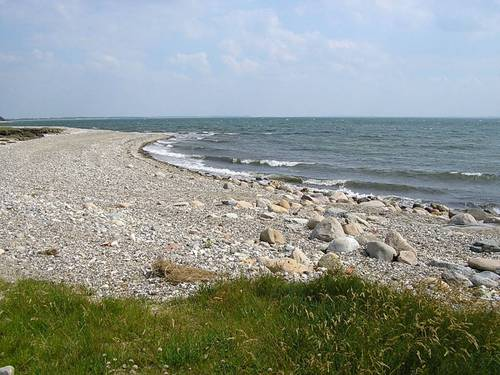
Nissum Bredning, the stone beach at Draget

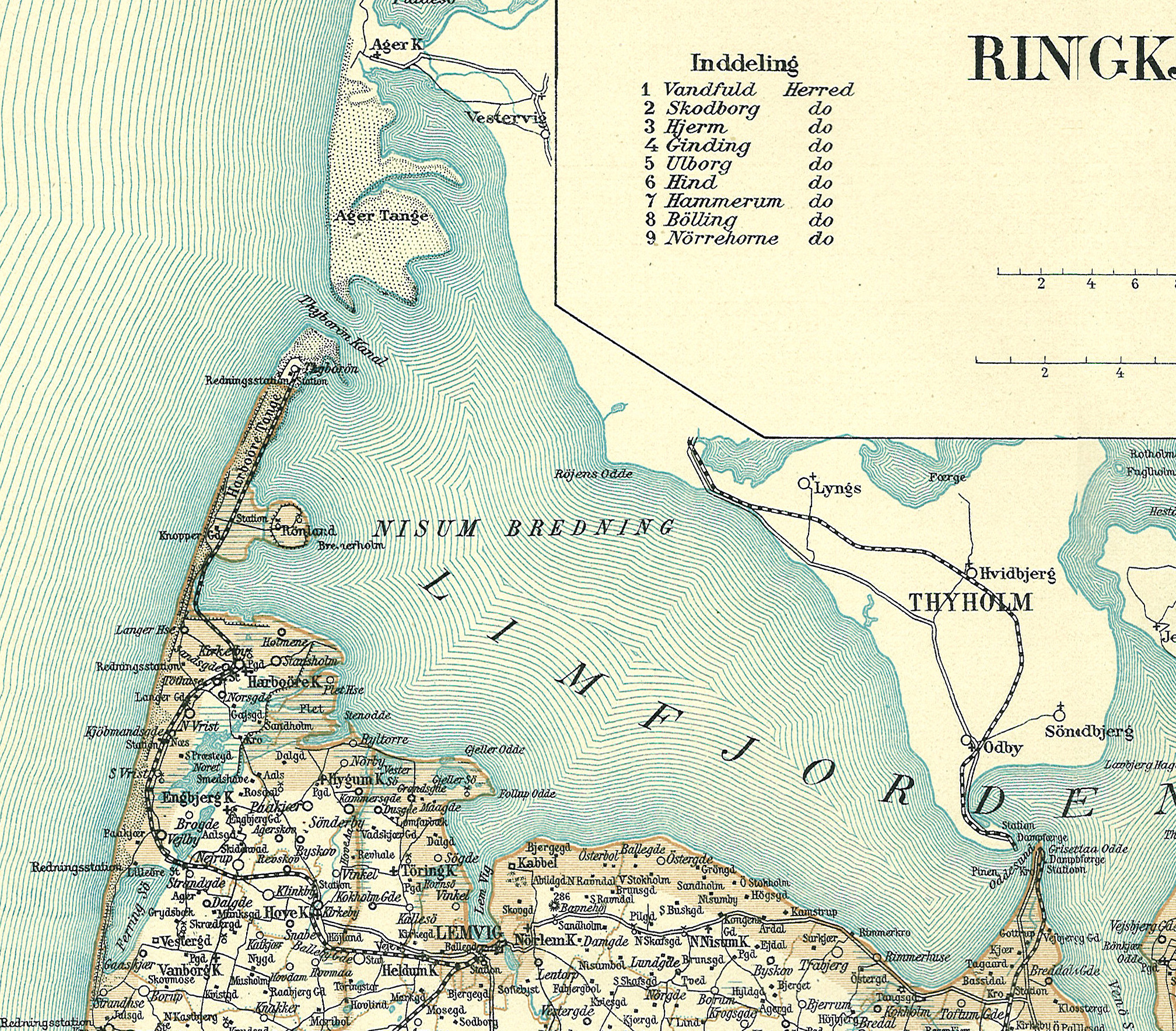
Nissum Bredning around 1900

Nissum Bredning is the westernmost bredning in the Limfjord situated between Thyborøn Channel, through which the fjord is connected to the North Sea, and Oddesund with Oddesund Bridge. Its size is around 200 km^{2} and the depth is up to 6 meters. The length from east to west is about 24 km, and from south Gjeller Odde to the north Røjensø Odde is about 10 kilometer; from here it continues as Krik Vig to the north. To the west, at Thyborøn and Harboøre Tange, there are some sandbanks, Fjordgrund and Gåseholm. There is a navigable channel Sælhundeholm Løb, going south from the channel along Agger Tange, passing Rønland with the chemical factory owned by FMC, formerly Cheminova, where it turns east.

At the south end of Harboøre Tange is the town Harboøre, from here the coast turns to the east and a bit south. Partly through the little Hygum Nor, there are several outlets from Ferring Sø, Søndervese, and Nørrevese. Further east after the outlet of Hove Å, close to the coast, we find Gjeller Sø, and east of that Gjeller Odde and Follup Odde forms the entry passage to Lem Vig, and in the south end of that is the city of Lemvig.

Nissum Bredning continues to the east to the cliff at Toftum Bjerge, which is up to 35 meters high and has layers from three different ice ages. There is a large area with holiday homes at Toftum, and from here the coast turns north to Grisetåodde and Oddesund, where the bridge leads both the road and the railway over to Thyholm, which southern part is called Sunddraget.

== Nature ==
Nissum Bredning is part of Natura 2000-Area 28 with Nissum Bredning, Skibsted Fjord and Agerø. It is a Ramsar wetland, Special Area of Conservation, and Special Protection Area.

- Both Harboøre- and Agger Tange was made a protected area in 1984. – an area of total 2.400 hectares.
