= Lemvig Line =

Railway line in Northwest Jutland, Denmark

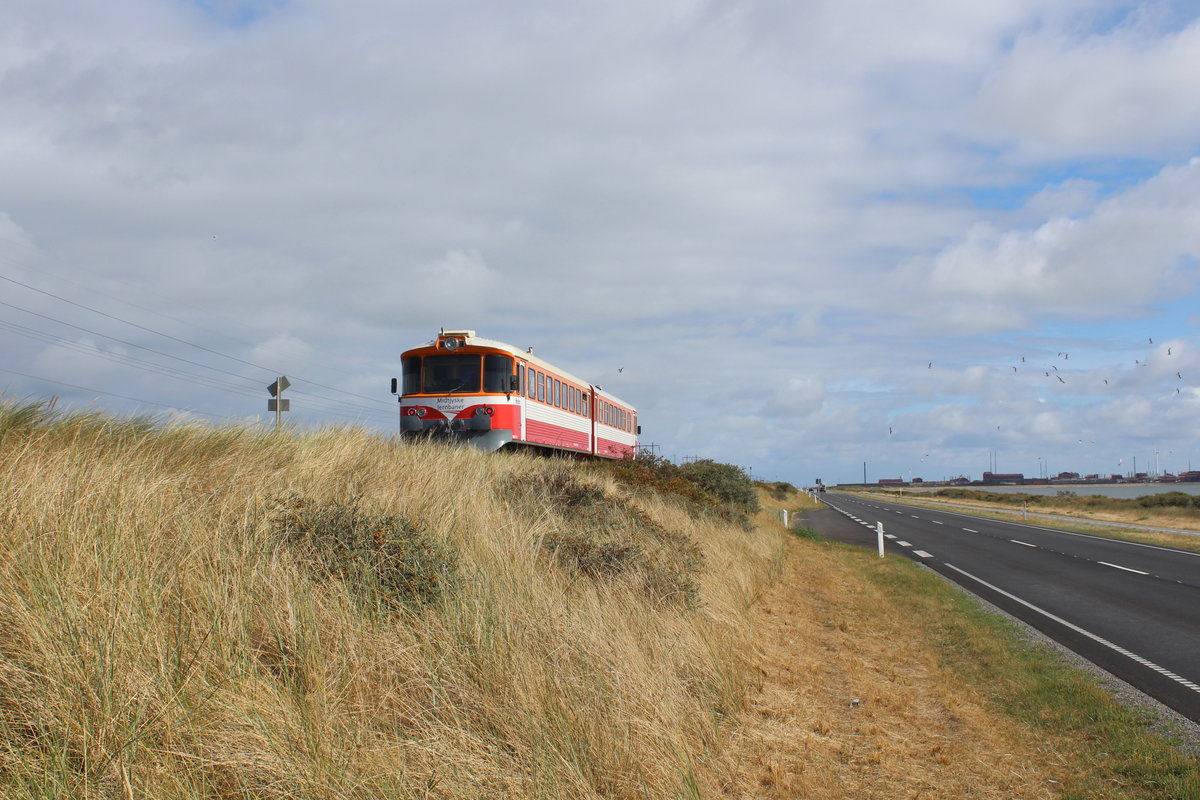
- The Lemvig Line near Harboøre in 2018

Overview
- Native name: Lemvigbanen
- Owner: Midtjyske Jernbaner
- Termini: Vemb; Thyborøn
- Stations: 19

Service
- Type: Railway line
- System: Danish railways
- Operator(s): Midtjyske Jernbaner

History
- Opened: 20. juli 1879 (Vemb-Lemvig); 22. juli 1899 (Lemvig-Harboøre); 1. november 1899 (Harboøre-Thyborøn)

Technical
- Line length: 56.3 km (35.0 mi)
- Number of tracks: 1
- Character: Local railway
- Track gauge: 1,435 mm (4 ft 8 1/2 in)
- Electrification: No
- Operating speed: 75 km/h (47 mph)
Route map
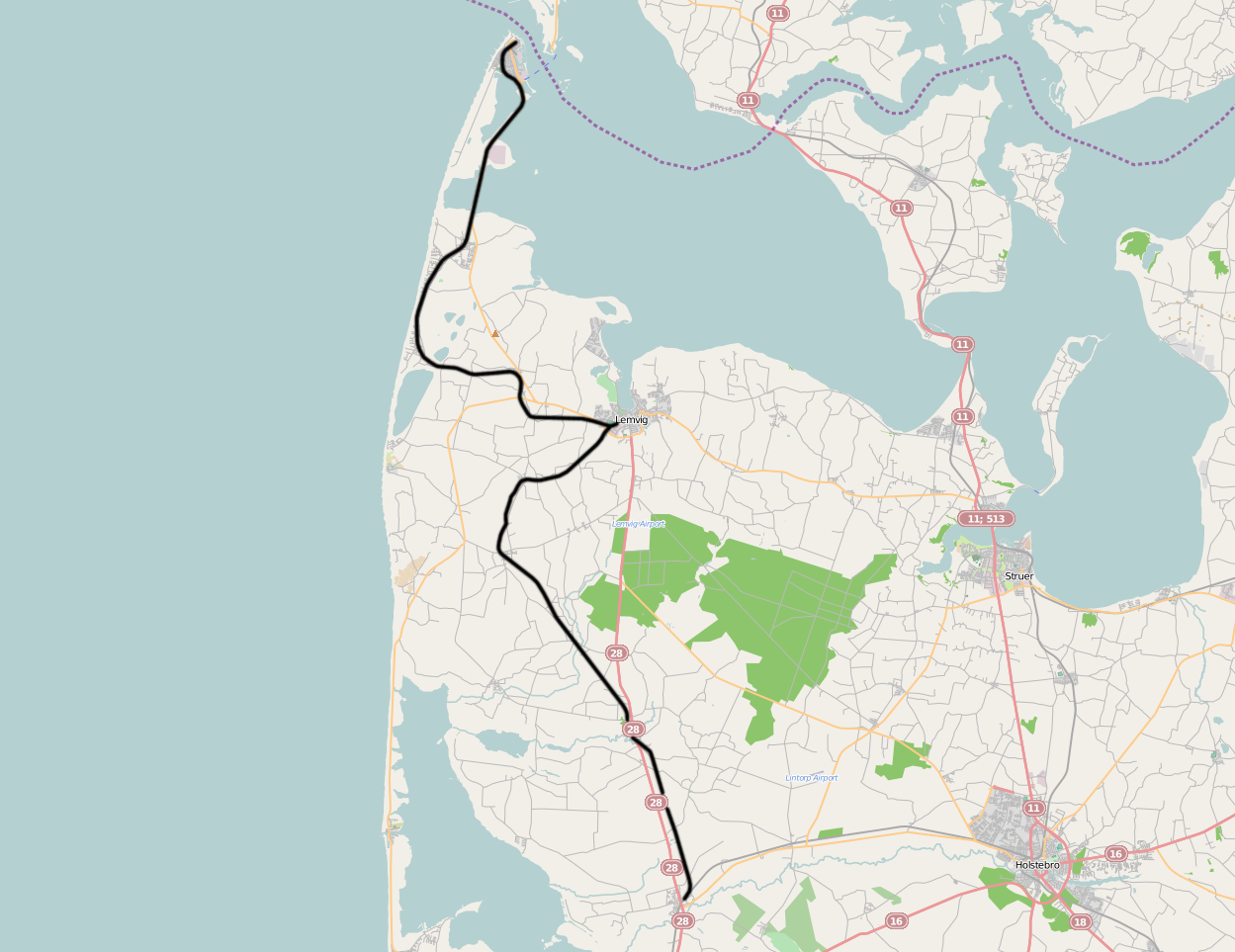
Map of the Lemvig Line

The Lemvig Line (Danish: Lemvigbanen or Vemb-Lemvig-Thyborøn Jernbane (VLTJ)) is a 57 km (35 mi) long local railway line in Northwest Jutland, Denmark. The railway links the fishing port of Thyborøn and the market town of Lemvig with the Danish railway network.

Established in sections between 1879 and 1899, the standard gauge single track railway line is mostly level. It is currently owned and operated by the regional railway company Midtjyske Jernbaner (MJBA) which runs frequent local train services from Thyborøn and Lemvig stations to Vemb station on the Esbjerg–Struer railway line, with onward connections from Vemb to the rest of Denmark.

The unelectrified railway is operated with a fleet of five double-unit Y-train railcars, but from 2025 battery trains are gradually starting to operate on the Lemvig Line, as the first railway line in Denmark. VLTJ has its own workshop and servicing facilities on the line in Lemvig.

== History ==
The first section of the railway line from Vemb on the Esbjerg–Struer railway line to the market town of Lemvig on the Limfjord was opened on 20. juli 1879. The second section from Lemvig to Harboøre opened on 22 July 1899, followed by the third and last section from Harboøre to the fishing port of Thyborøn by the North Sea on 1 November 1899.

The railway was used to test a prototype hydrogen-powered train in 2010.

== Operating company ==
Vemb-Lemvig-Thyborøn Jernbane A/S
- Company type: Aktieselskab
- Founded: 1879
- Defunct: 2008
- Fate: Merged with Odderbanen
- Headquarters: Lemvig, Denmark
- Area served: Denmark
- Services: Passenger transportation
- Website: www.lemvigbanen.dk (defunct)

The Lemvig Line was built and originally operated by the two railway companies Vemb-Lemvig Railway (VLJ) and Lemvig-Thyborøn Railway (LTJ), which on August 16, 1921 were merged to form the company Vemb-Lemvig-Thyborøn Jernbane A/S (VLTJ). Until 1 January 2008, the railway was operated by VLTJ which was then merged with Hads-Ning Herreders Jernbane A/S (the operating company of the Odder Line in East Jutland) to form the regional railway company Midtjyske Jernbaner.

== Stations ==
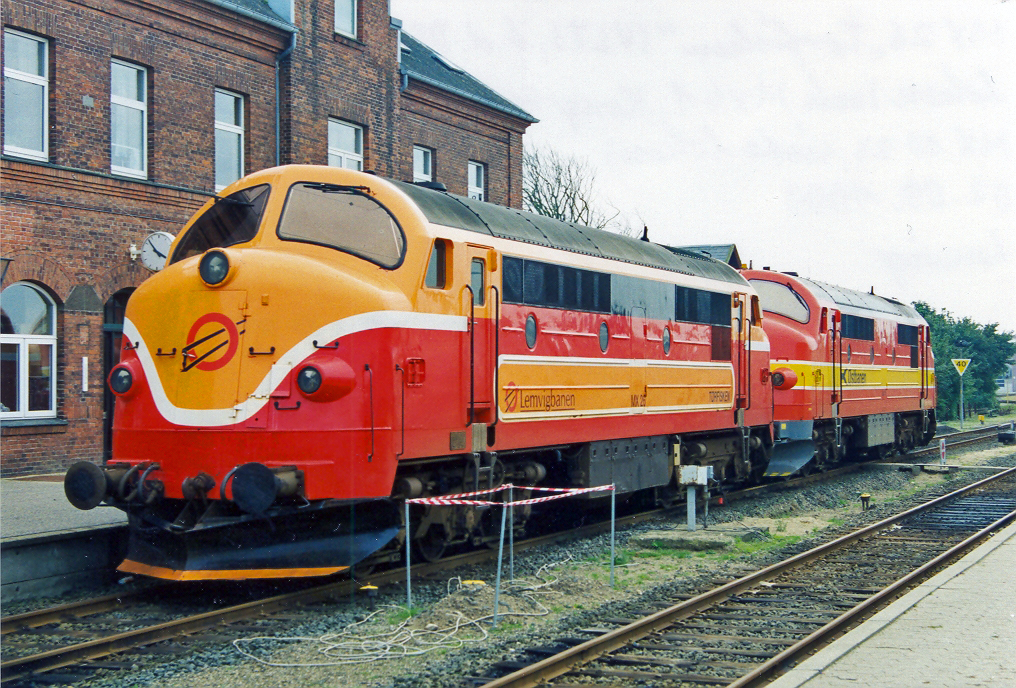
VLTJ MX 26 (front), previously a DSB class MX diesel locomotive, at Lemvig in 1999.

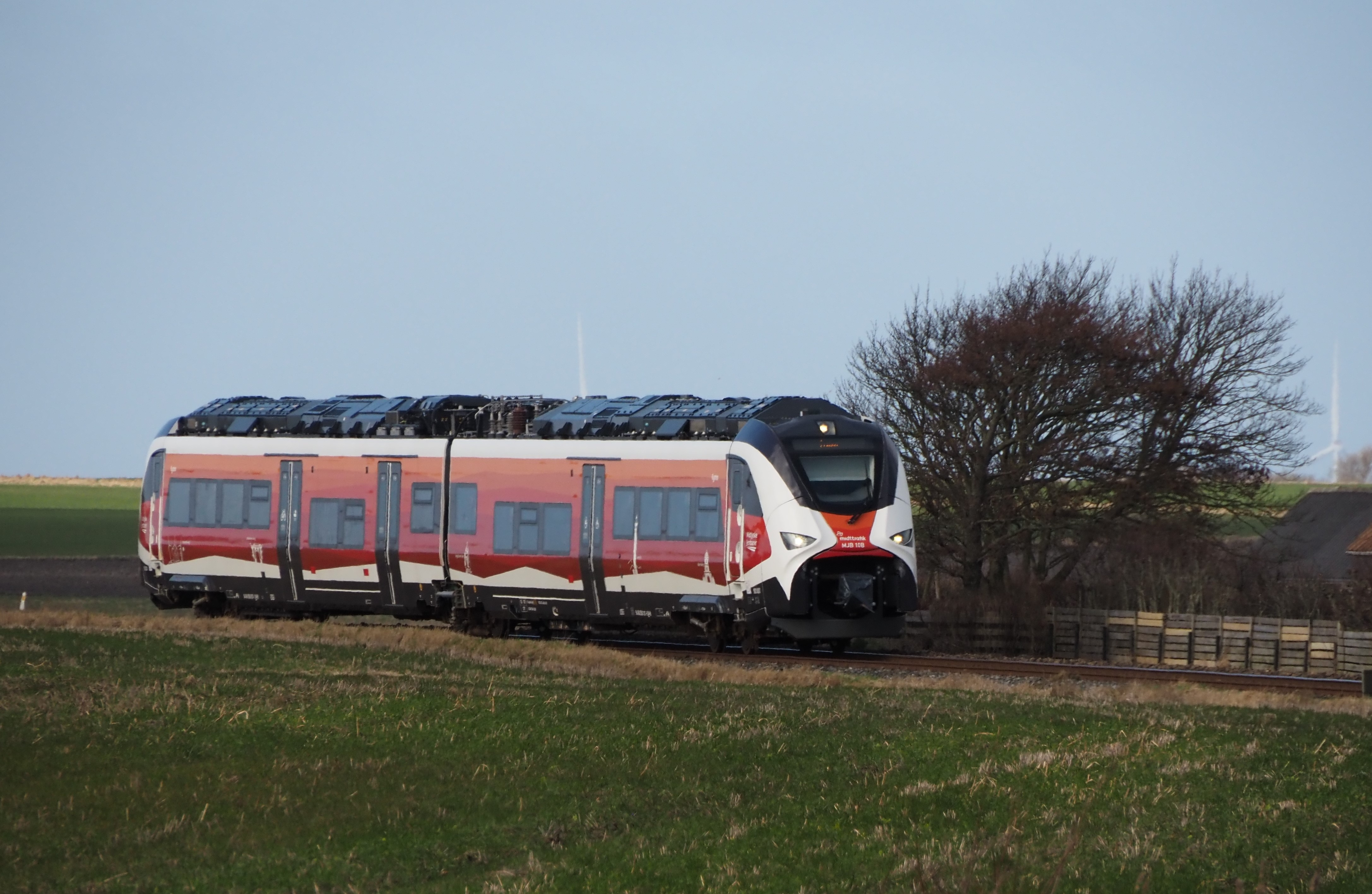
MJB 10B arriving Klinkby station

=== Victoria Street Station ===
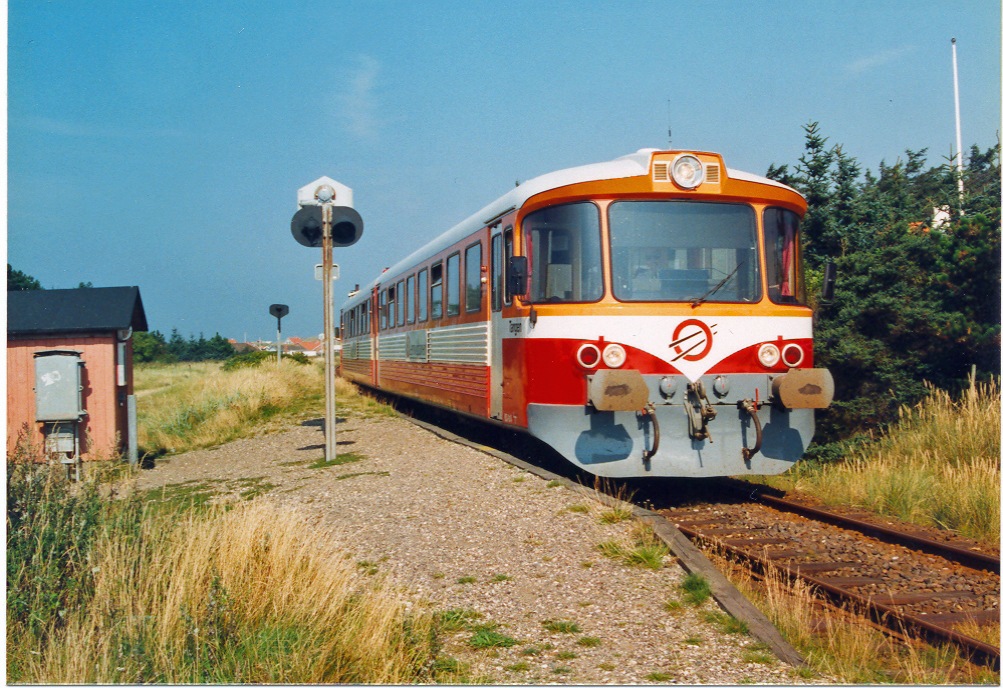
Lemvigbanen train at Victoria Street station (in Vejlby)

A single platform station on the line. Its original name was Vejlby Stoppested. Previously, passengers who wanted to ride the train had to turn the signal themselves, a vertical pole with a plate at the top, to make the train stop. The train driver then made sure to turn the signal back before the train moved on.

This station, approximately 1 km north of Vejlby, in a popular summer tourist spot, was originally open during the summer period to cater for the bathing tourists who from Vejlby Nord had to travel approximately 500m to the sea along a gravel road.

The name Victoria Street Station was assigned by some citizens, allegedly at a time when the Lemvig Line took too long to refit a nameplate at the platform. The name refers to a nearby Viktoriavej and was formally recognized by the railway company in 1991.

== Popular culture ==
The railway achieved fame in Denmark, when the band Tørfisk in 1985 wrote the song "VLTJ" describing a trip with the railway. This song later achieved cult status.

The song is based on the Irish folk song "Poor Paddy Works on the Railway".

== See also ==
- History of rail transport in Denmark
- Rail transport in Denmark
- List of railway lines in Denmark
- Transport in Denmark
