= Thyborøn =

- Town
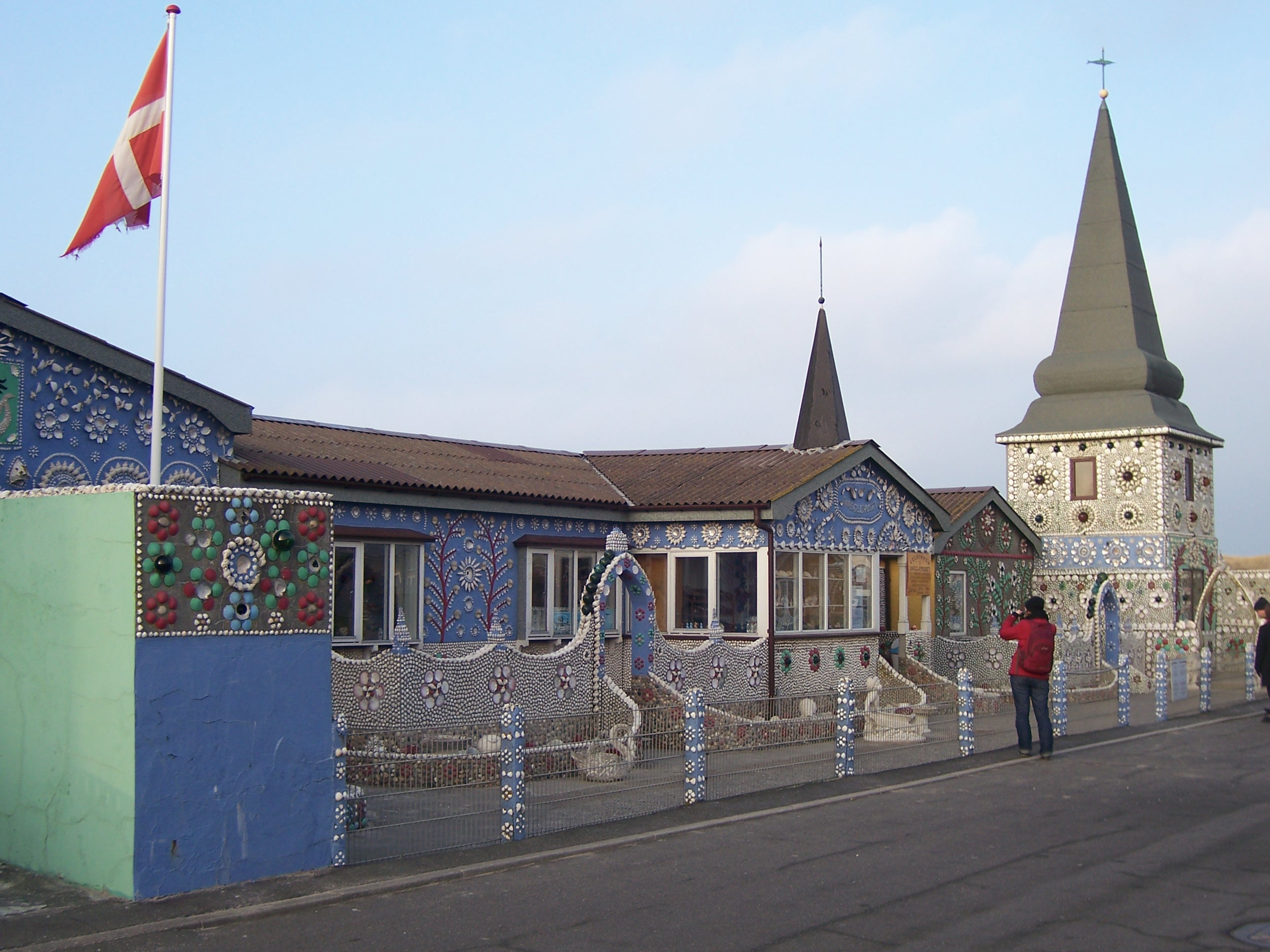
- Sneglehuset (Snail shell house) in Thyborøn, Western Jutland

- Location in Denmark Thyborøn (Central Denmark Region)
- Coordinates: 56°41′51″N 8°12′39″E
- Country: Denmark
- Region: Region Midtjylland
- Municipality: Lemvig Municipality

Area
  - Urban: 1.81 km^{2} (0.70 sq mi)

Population (2026)
  - Urban: 1,719
  - Urban density: 950/km^{2} (2,460/sq mi)
- Time zone: UTC+1 (CET)
  - Summer (DST): UTC+2 (CEST)
- Postal code: DK-7680 Thyborøn

Thyborøn is a fishing village in Jutland, Denmark, with a population of 1,719 (1 January 2026), mainly known for being the site of numerous shipwrecks, such as that of the Imperial Russian naval vessel Alexander Nevsky.

It is located in Region Midtjylland in Lemvig Municipality.

Thyborøn was the municipal seat of the former Thyborøn-Harboøre Municipality until 1 January 2007.

The town is served by Thyborøn railway station which opened in 1899. It is the northern terminus of the Lemvig railway line which connects Thyborøn with Lemvig, Vemb and the rest of the Danish rail network.

== Geography ==
Thyborøn is located on the northern tip of Harboøre Tange at the western terminus of the Limfjord canal that cuts across the Jutland peninsula.

=== Climate ===
Climate data for Thyborøn (1971–2000 normals, extremes 1961–2000)
Month	Jan	Feb	Mar	Apr	May	Jun	Jul	Aug	Sep	Oct	Nov	Dec	Year
Record high °C (°F)	9.6 (49.3)	9.6 (49.3)	16.8 (62.2)	20.6 (69.1)	26.8 (80.2)	28.8 (83.8)	30.8 (87.4)	31.8 (89.2)	24.2 (75.6)	20.4 (68.7)	14.4 (57.9)	11.4 (52.5)	31.8 (89.2)
Mean daily maximum °C (°F)	3.6 (38.5)	3.2 (37.8)	5.0 (41.0)	8.5 (47.3)	13.6 (56.5)	16.2 (61.2)	18.4 (65.1)	18.8 (65.8)	15.7 (60.3)	11.9 (53.4)	7.9 (46.2)	5.3 (41.5)	10.7 (51.3)
Daily mean °C (°F)	2.1 (35.8)	1.8 (35.2)	3.3 (37.9)	6.2 (43.2)	10.9 (51.6)	13.8 (56.8)	16.0 (60.8)	16.4 (61.5)	13.6 (56.5)	10.2 (50.4)	6.4 (43.5)	3.8 (38.8)	8.7 (47.7)
Mean daily minimum °C (°F)	0.5 (32.9)	0.1 (32.2)	1.6 (34.9)	4.1 (39.4)	8.5 (47.3)	11.7 (53.1)	14.0 (57.2)	14.4 (57.9)	11.8 (53.2)	8.4 (47.1)	4.8 (40.6)	2.1 (35.8)	6.8 (44.2)
Record low °C (°F)	−15.6 (3.9)	−13.5 (7.7)	−8.4 (16.9)	−4.0 (24.8)	1.0 (33.8)	6.2 (43.2)	9.2 (48.6)	9.5 (49.1)	6.0 (42.8)	0.0 (32.0)	−7.2 (19.0)	−11.2 (11.8)	−15.6 (3.9)
Average precipitation mm (inches)	63.4 (2.50)	42.8 (1.69)	47.4 (1.87)	34.3 (1.35)	37.6 (1.48)	46.5 (1.83)	45.4 (1.79)	65.4 (2.57)	81.6 (3.21)	88.8 (3.50)	86.1 (3.39)	76.1 (3.00)	719.2 (28.31)
Average precipitation days (≥ 0.1 mm)	17.6	14.1	15.7	11.7	10.1	10.6	11.0	12.2	15.2	17.2	18.1	18.7	172.7
Average snowy days	4.5	4.2	3.4	0.8	0.0	0.0	0.0	0.0	0.0	0.0	0.7	3.3	17.0
Source: DMI

== Port of Thyborøn ==
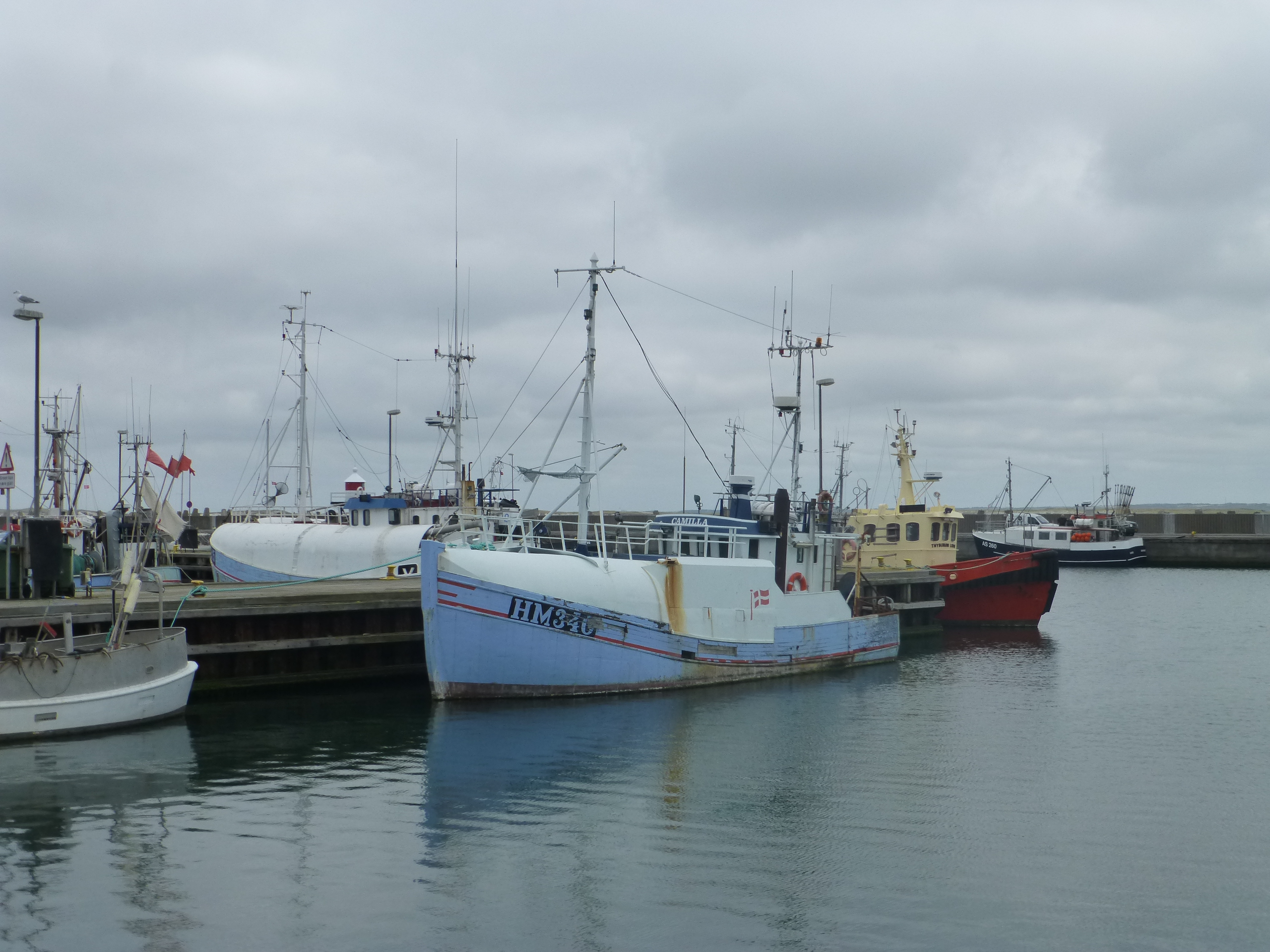
Thyborøn Port

The port of Thyborøn was originally established as a fishing harbour in 1914. Given its strategic location close to fishing grounds, neighbouring countries around the North Sea, gravel pits and the future wind farms in the North Sea, the port has been steadily evolving over the years.

== Attractions ==
The snail house in Thyborøn is lined with thousands of snail and conch shells both inside and out. It was created by fisherman Alfred Pedersen from 1949 to 1974, and is now a small museum.

The Sea War Museum Jutland, founded by Gert Normann Andersen, opened on 15 September 2015.

Jyllandsakvariet is an Aquarium with fish from the North Sea and the Limfjord and many other experiences.

== Notable people ==
- Johnny Madsen (1951–2024) a Danish musician, songwriter and painter was born in Thyborøn.
- Henning Toft Bro (born 1956 in Thyborøn) a Danish prelate, the Bishop of Aalborg
- Louise Gade (born 1972 in Thyborøn) a Danish cand.jur., president of Aarhus VIA University College and former Mayor of Aarhus, Denmark
