= Lemvig =

- Town
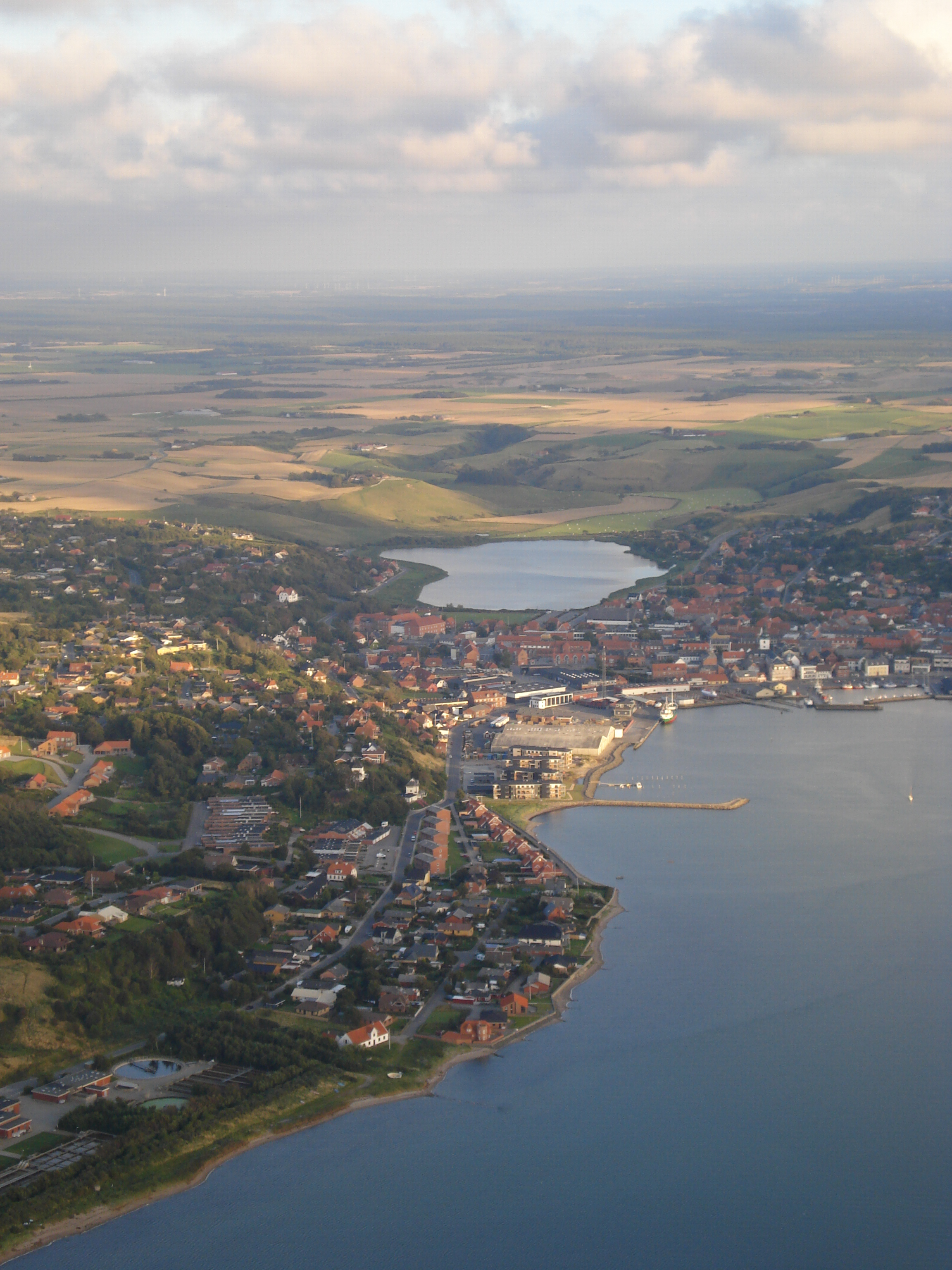
- Aerial view of Lemvig

- Coat of arms

- Lemvig in Denmark Lemvig (Central Denmark Region)
- Coordinates: 56°33′N 8°19′E
- Country: Denmark
- Region: Central Denmark (Midtjylland)
- Municipality: Lemvig

Government
  - Mayor: Erik Flyvholm

Area
  - Urban: 5 km^{2} (1.9 sq mi)
- Elevation: 0 m (0 ft)

Population (2026)
  - Urban: 6,750
  - Urban density: 1,400/km^{2} (3,500/sq mi)
  - Gender: 3,253 males and 3,497 females
- Demonym: Lemviger
- Time zone: UTC+1 (CET)
  - Summer (DST): UTC+2 (CEST)
- Postal code: DK-7620 Lemvig
- Website: www.lemvig.dk

Lemvig is a market town on the Limfjord in North Jutland, Denmark. The town has a population of 6,750 (2026), and is the seat of Lemvig Municipality in the Central Denmark Region.

Lemvig lies between the Limfjord and Lemvig Lake (Danish: Lemvig Sø), and is nestled between hills to the east and west. The local topography was shaped during the last ice age. It was settled during the Middle Ages and saw significant expansion during the 19th century as a result of trade.

== Geography ==
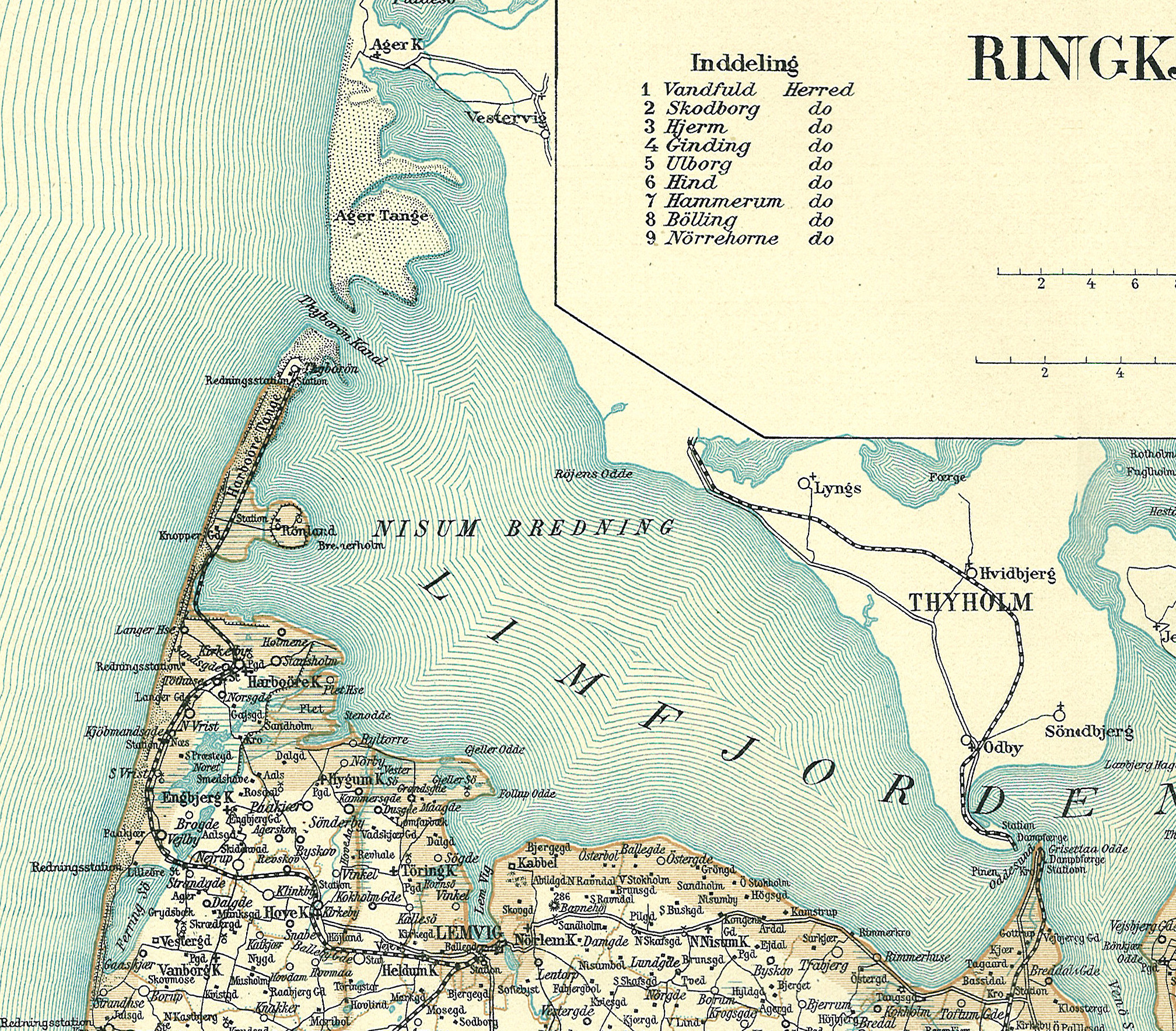
Map of Nissum Bredning, c. 1900, showing Lem Vig on the southern shore.

The town is situated 10 kilometers (6¼ miles) from the North Sea and 375 kilometers (233 mi) from Copenhagen. The town takes its name from the Lem Vig (lit. 'Lem Bay'), a bay on the western part of the Limfjord, and part of Nissum Bredning. The town lies at the interior end of the bay, and originally was settled on a flat strip of land between the fjord and Lemvig Lake (Danish: Lemvig Sø), surrounded to the east and west by steep hills. Gradually, the town has expanded and spread up the sides of the valley.

Until the Agger Tange was breached in 1825, Lemvig was isolated from the north sea, though it was located on the shipping route to Thy within the Limfjord. Facing the Limfjord, the harbor of the town has a 2-meter high concrete seawall to protect the city from westerly storms which push water from the North Sea into the Limfjord.

== History ==
The oldest record which mentions Lemvig were a series of royal letters from 1234 and 1237 which mention the town of Læmwich and Lemvich. During the Middle Ages, Lemvig remained a small town with only a church. In 1479, a fire destroyed the town hall.

In 1542 King Christian III ordered the establishment a school in the town. Lemvig was designated as a market town, perhaps as early as 1471, but certainly by 1545. By 1638, it was described in priest's reports as "a small market town".

The early modern period saw Lemvig go into a slight decline. In 1672 the town had a population of 450, but by 1769 only had 316. This decline may have been the result of a series of fires, the largest of which in 1684 burned most of the town down. It wasn't until the mid 19th century that Lemvig saw significant expansion, as the opening of the Agger Tange in 1825 and the opening of the Løgstør Canal in the 1850s had brought new opportunities to the town. A new port was constructed in the 1850s to facilitate increased agricultural trade through the Limfjord to Aalborg.

In 1879 the Lemvig railway line was constructed through Lemvig. To save money, its station had been constructed on the plateau above the town, rather than being brought down into the valley itself. This meant that goods from the city needed to be hauled up the steep slopes before being shipped south. With increasing volumes of goods, it became evident that a rail connection directly at the harbour was need, and finished construction in 1892.

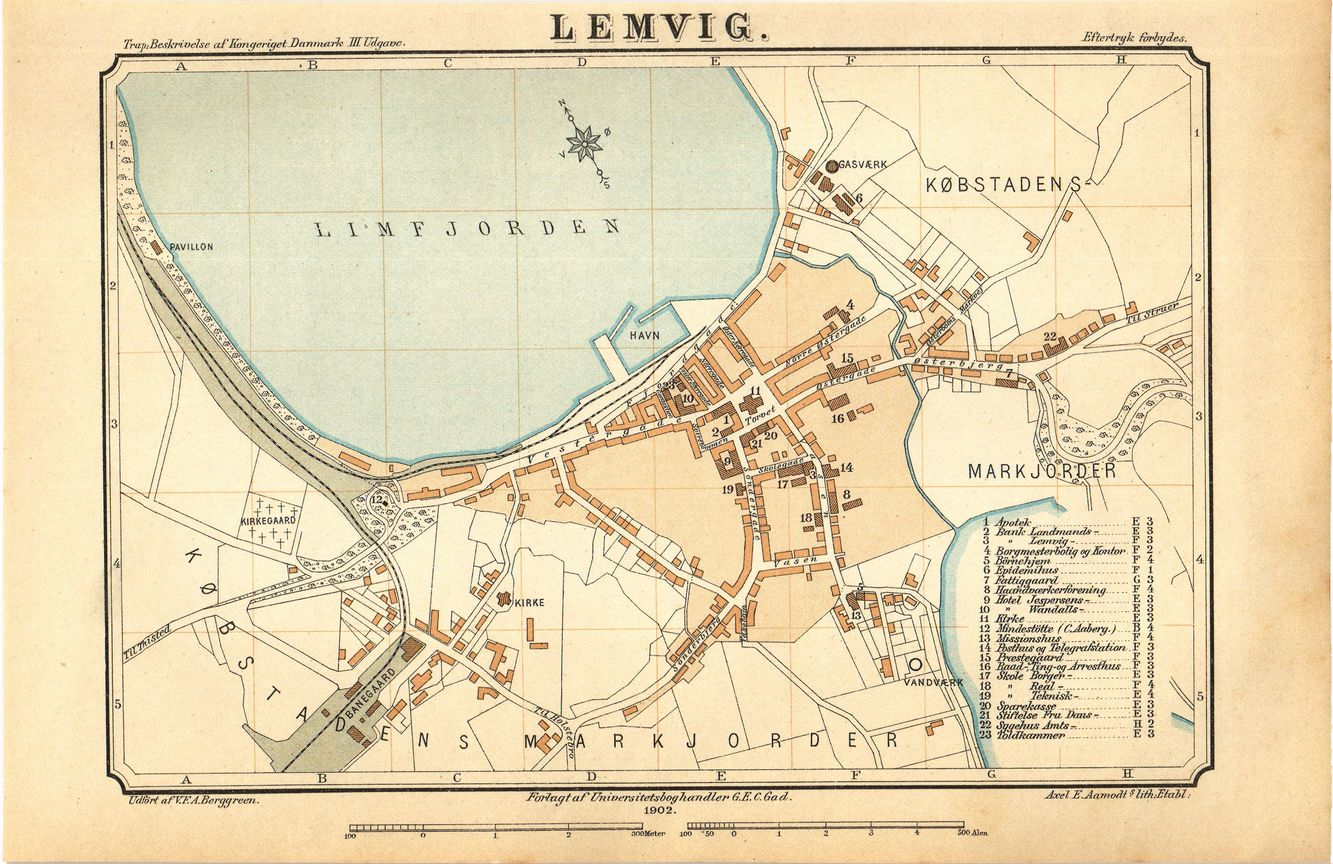
Map of Lemvig from 1902 from J.P. Trap's Kongeriget Danmark.

In 1850 the towns population was about 860, but by 1911 had ballooned to 3,835. By the turn of the 20th century, a number of businesses had been established in the town, including a tobacco factory, brickworks, steam mill, and a printing house. Three newspapers were in circulation: the Levig Avis, the Lemvig Daglad, and the Lemvig Folkeblad.

Although no suburban development took place during the Interwar period, Lemvig's population continued to grow, reaching 4,574 inhabitants by 1930. During that year's census, of the working population: 356 were self-employed; 1,604 worked in craft and industry; 701 in trade; 533 in transportation; 283 in agriculture, forestry, and fishing; 430 in domestic labor; and 616 were unemployed. After World War II, Lemvig expanded into two new suburbs: Østerbjerg and Rønbjerg Hage, again increasing the population to 6,371 by 1965.

Before the Municipal reform of 1970, Lemvig was located in Skodborg Herred within Ringkjøbing County. Following the reform, the town was made the seat of the newly established Lemvig Municipality. During the Municipal reform of 2007, Thyborøn-Harboøre Municipality was merged into Lemvig Municipality.

== Infrastructure ==
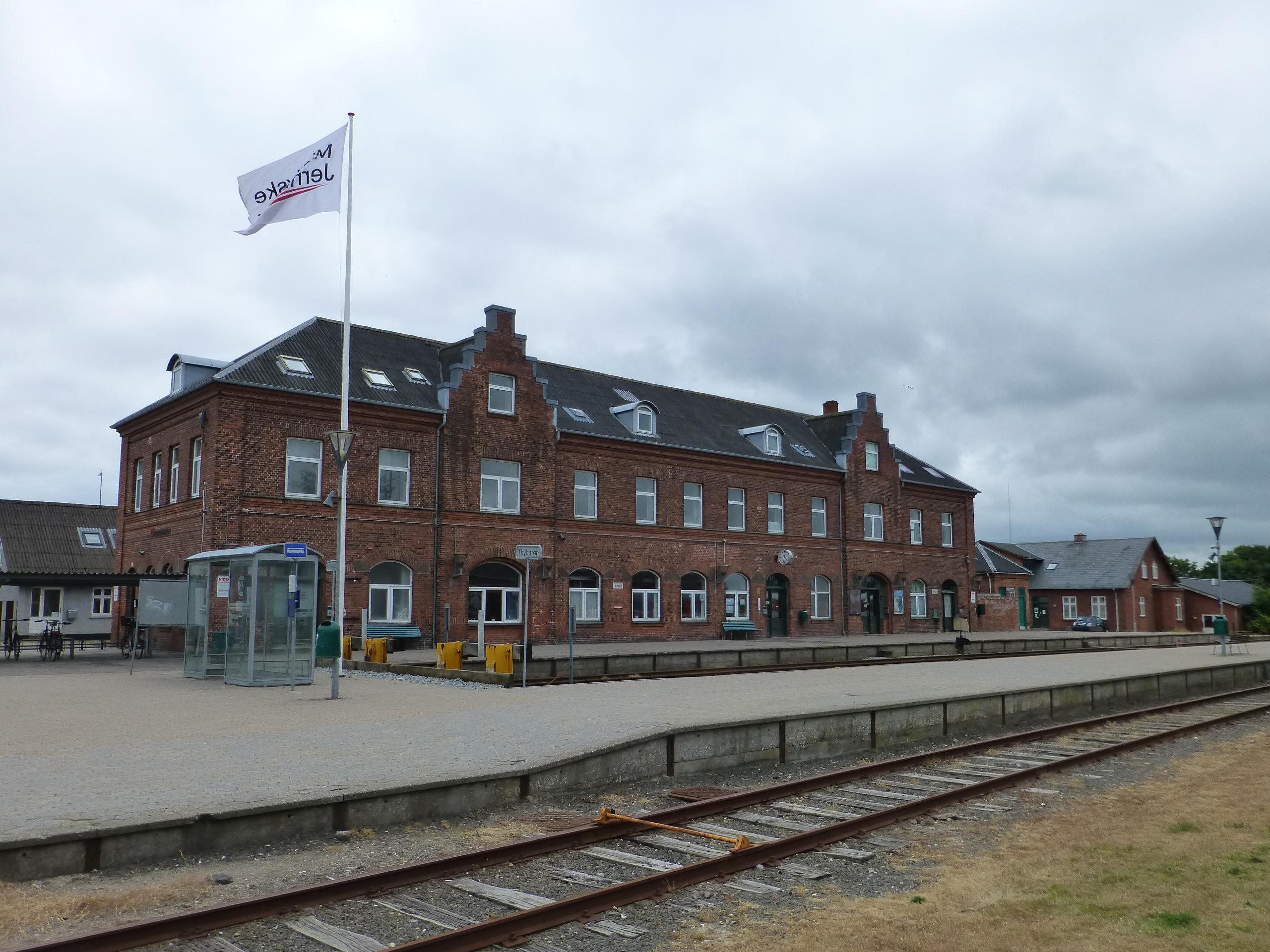
Platform facade of Lemvig railway station.

Lemvig is served by Lemvig railway station (Danish: Lemvig Banegård), which opened in 1879. It is on the Lemvig railway line which connects Lemvig with Vemb and the Danish rail network to the south. Lemvig also has a grass airstrip (ICAO: EKLV).

Lemvig's economy is based on traditional sectors such as metal, wood and furniture industry. Among the largest employers in the town are KK Electronics, Egholm A/S, Cheminova and The Danish Coastal Directorate.

== Religion ==
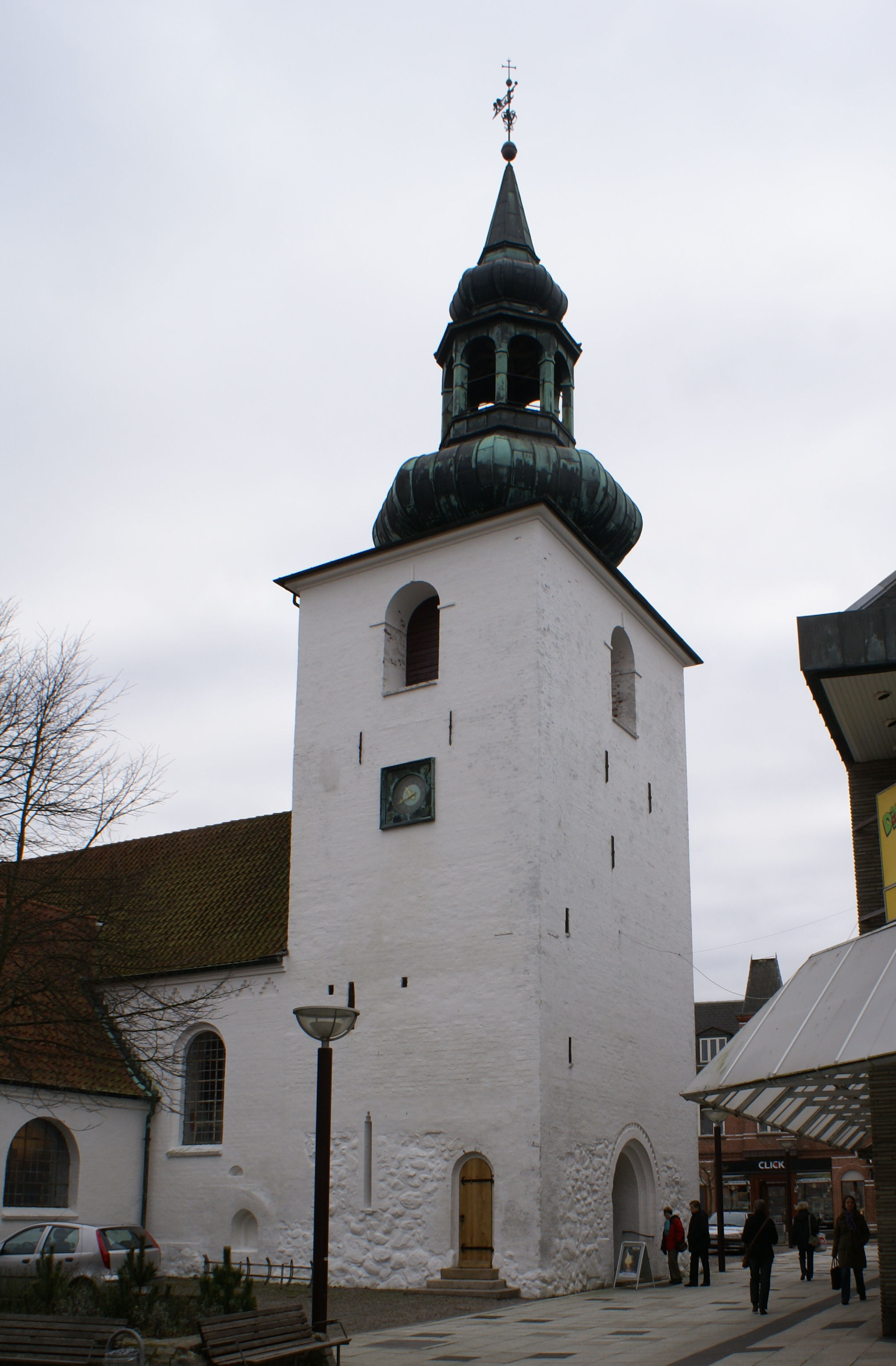
Lemvig Church.

Lemvig Church is in the center of the town and is part of the Church of Denmark's Lemvig Parish (Danish: Lemvig Sogn). The church originally had a high, pointed spire, but as significantly remodeled and expanded in the 1930s, at which point it received its current onion-shaped dome.

St. John's Church (Danish: Johanneskirken) is a Grundtvigan congregation, consecrated in 1883. It was built by Architect Andreas Bentsen with the help of apprentices from Vallekilde Folk High School.

== Sports ==
The handball team Lemvig-Thyborøn Håndbold has played in the top division in Denmark multiple times.

== Twin town ==
- Szigethalom, Hungary, since 1998

== Notable people ==
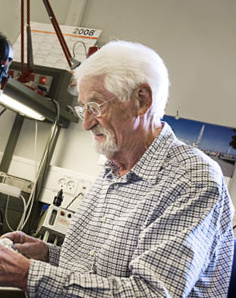
JC Skou, 2008

- Jacob Nicolai Wilse (1735 in Lemvig – 1801), Norwegian chronicler and meteorologist
- Herman Bagger (1800 in Lemvig – 1880), Norwegian newspaper editor and politician.
- Carl Johannes With (1877 in Lemvig – 1923), Danish doctor and arachnologist, specialising in pseudoscorpions and mites
- Kai Holm (1896 in Lemvig – 1985), Danish film actor, 41 films between 1927 and 1979
- Marie Bak, (Danish Wiki) (born 1898) a Danish writer and poet.
- Ruth Smith (1913–1958), Faroese artist, lived in Lemvig
- Jens Christian Skou (born 1918 in Lemvig – 2018), medical doctor and winner of the Nobel Prize in Chemistry in 1997
- Elisabeth Møller Jensen (born 1946 in Lemvig), literary historian and feminist, director of KVINFO 1990–2014
- Elof Westergaard (born 1962 in Lemvig), Danish theologian, Bishop of Ribe since 2014
- Sinne Eeg (born 1977 in Lemvig), Danish jazz vocalist and composer.

=== Sport ===
- Iver Schriver (born 1949 in Lemvig), former Danish footballer
- Jannick Green (born 1988 in Lemvig) a Danish handball player; team gold medallist at the 2016 Summer Olympics
- Victor Torp (born 1999 in Lemvig) a Danish footballer, plays for Coventry City in the Premier League
- Mikkel Kallesøe (born 1997 in Lemvig) a Danish footballer, plays for Randers FC
- Max Rasmussen (born 1945 in Lemvig), former Danish footballer
- Søren Krogh (born 1977 in Lemvig), former Danish footballer and now assistant coach for Odense Boldklub
