= Siege of Kolding (1341) =

1341 siege in Denmark

Coordinates: 55°29′30″N 9°28′27″E

- Part of Niels Ebbesen's Rebellion
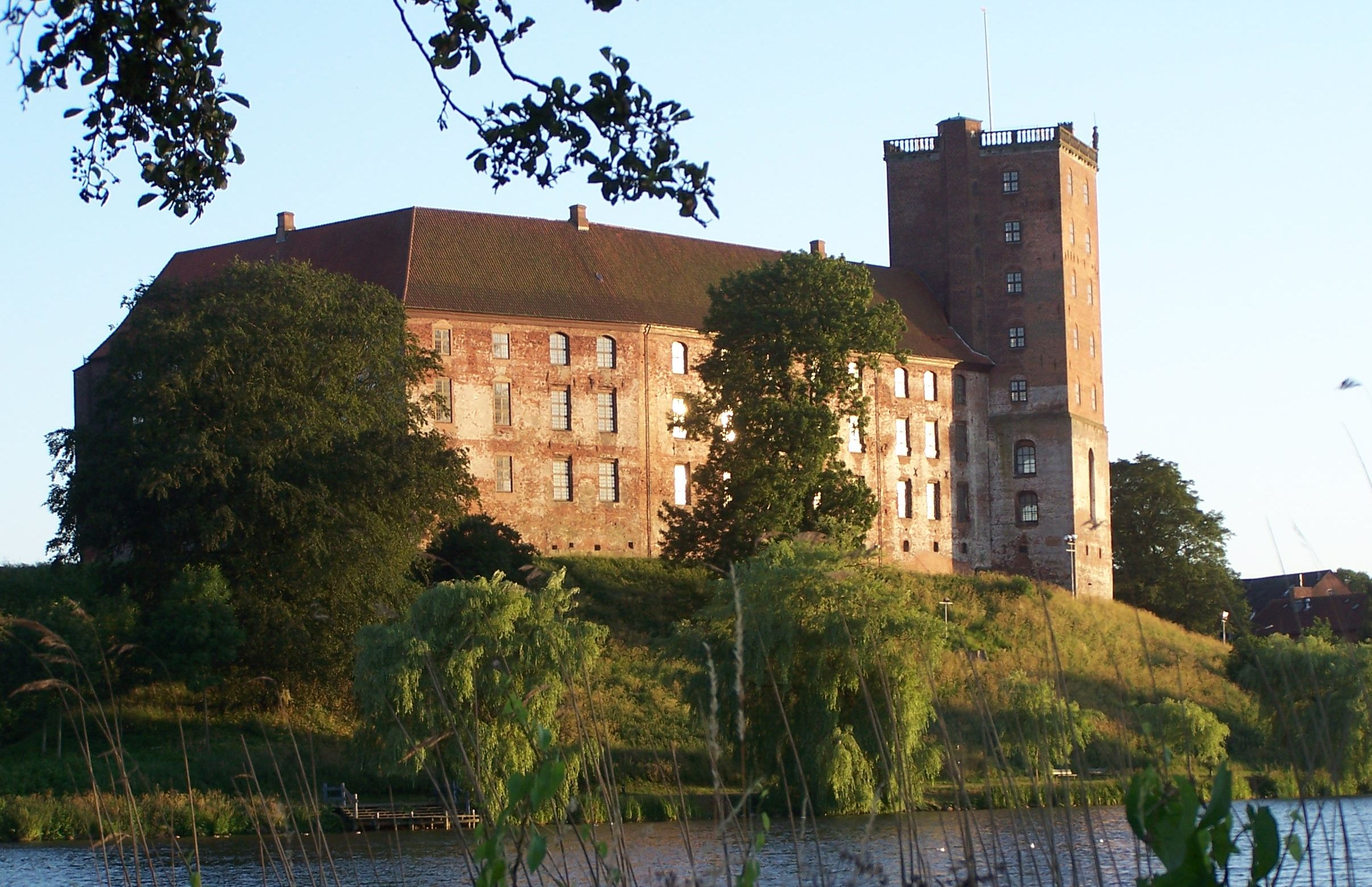
- Present-day Koldinghus seen from the north, 2006.
Date	1341
Location	Koldinghus, Jutland
Result	Holsteinian victory
Territorial changes	Holsteinian raid on Jutland

Belligerents
(Medieval Denmark) Jutish rebels	Holstein

Commanders and leaders
(Medieval Denmark) Unknown	Henry II

Units involved
(Medieval Denmark) Jutish peasants and knights	Koldinghus garrison

Strength
Unknown, but large	Unknown

Casualties and losses
Unknown	Unknown

The siege of Kolding (Danish: Belejringen af Kolding) also known as the siege of Koldinghus, was a siege by Jutish rebels on the Holsteinian-held Castle of Koldinghus in 1341. The siege ended unsuccessful, and Count Henry II of Holstein-Rendsburg retaliated by raiding much of Jutland.

== Background ==
In 1340, a group of 50 Jutes, led by Niels Ebbesen, a minor nobleman, launched a surprise attack on Count Gerhard III, who was regent of Denmark at that time, in Randers, resulting in his assassination. This event sent shockwaves throughout the country and in the aftermath, Ebbesen and his followers fled south across the Gudenå River, continuing their rebellion further south.

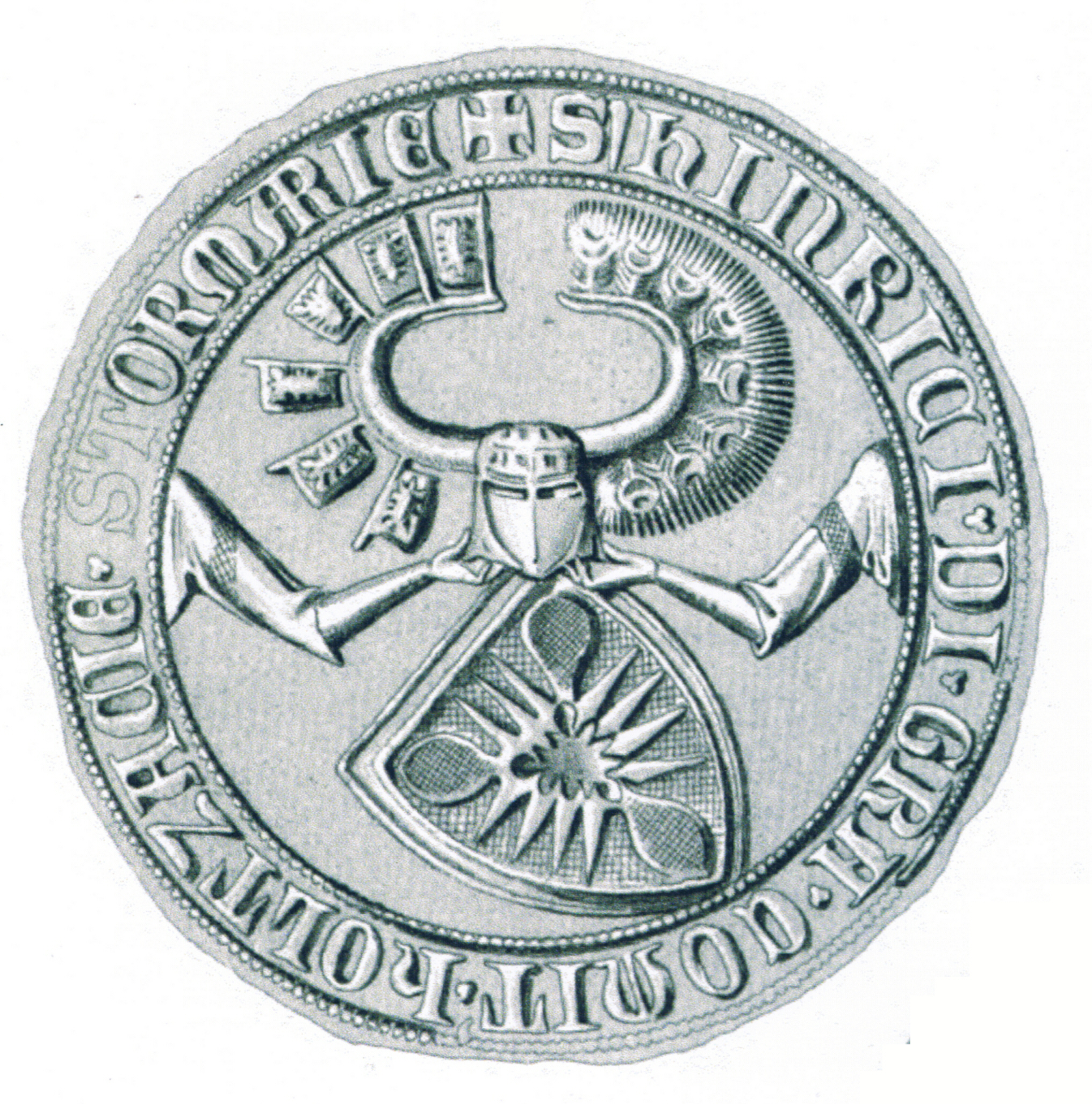
Seal of Henry II (1317 – 1382, called Iron Henry), Count of Holstein-Rendsburg and Duke of Schleswig. The seal dates from around 1343.

Ebbesen and his men now launched an assault on a Holsteinian fortification near present-day Skjern River, killing many Germans. Next, they set their sights on the strategically important Skanderborg Castle and besieged the place. However, the besieged Germans got reinforcements and confronted the Danes in open battle. The battle resulted in the death of Niels Ebbesen, however, the revolt did not seem to have ended as a result of the battle.

== Siege ==
The year after the battle, the Jutish rebels had gone, with great power, towards Koldinghus, which they would try to conquer. However, Count Henry of Holstein-Rendsburg (nickname Iron Henry), who had inherited his father's uncontrollable fighting spirit and warrior skill, came to the fortification's rescue, just like he did with Skanderborg. In the following confrontation, the Jutish rebels retreated from Koldinghus, and the Count would retaliate against the Jutes by raiding much of their controlled area. As a result, Henry gathered a big booty and left again to his base at Funen.

== Aftermath ==
The explanation for Henry's far-reaching raids lies in his area of control: Henry and the Germans had control over Funen, which meant they could both raid west in Jutland and east on Zealand.

== See also ==
- Siege of Kolding (1368–1369) – Siege in Denmark, 1369
- Niels Ebbesen – Danish folk hero (1308–1340)
- Siege of Skanderborg – 1340 siege in Denmark
- Gerhard III, Count of Holstein-Rendsburg – Count of Holstein-Rendsburg
- Battle of Nonnebjerg – 1340 battle in Denmark

== Works cited ==
- Dzeko, Nedim (2011). "Niels Ebbesen, ca. 1300-1340". Danmarkshistorien.
- Reinhardt, Christian (1880). Valdemar Atterdag og hans Kongegjerning (in Danish). Gad.
- Olsen, Rikke Agnete (2014-10-20). Danish Medieval Castles. Aarhus Universitetsforlag. ISBN 978-87-7184-007-0.
- Flaskager, Elmo (2023). "Lundenæs Slot". Skjern Udviklingsforum (in Danish).
- Skyum-Nielsen, Niels (2022-02-04). Fruer og vildmænd. Dansk middelalderhistorie. Bind 2 (in Danish). Lindhardt og Ringhof. ISBN 978-87-28-05016-3.
