= Siege of Kalundborg =

1341 siege in Denmark

- Part of the Kalundborg War
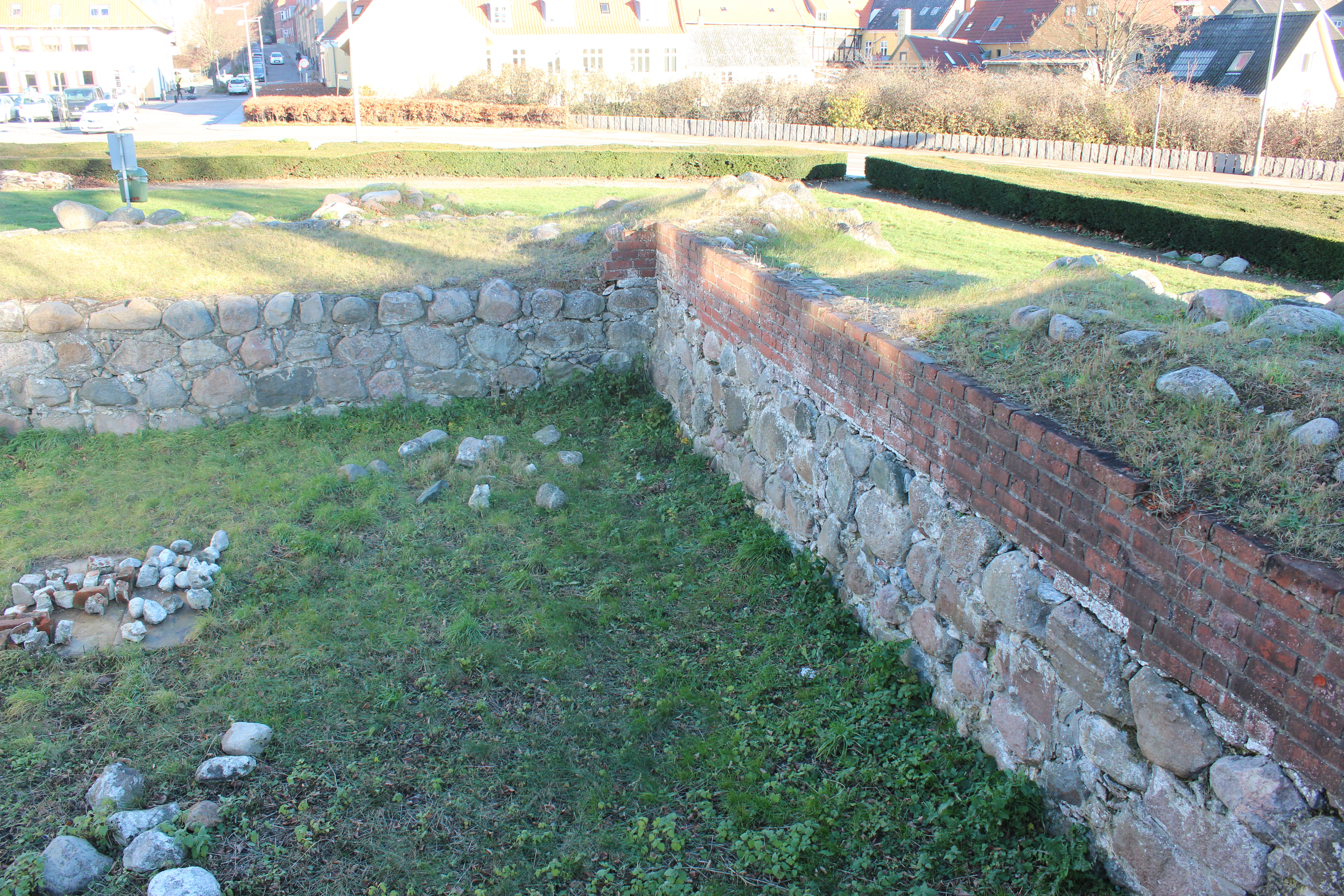
- Ruins of Kalundborg Castle in 2016.
Date	July – September 1341
Location	Kalundborg, Zealand 55°40′53″N 11°5′6″E
Result	Norwegian–Holsteinian victory
Territorial changes	Danish retreat

Belligerents
Denmark; Hanseatic League; Holstein-Plön	Norway; Holstein-Rendsburg

Commanders and leaders
(Medieval Denmark) Valdemar IV (Medieval Denmark) Peder Jensen; John III	(Kingdom of Norway (872–1397)) Ingeborg of Norway (Kingdom of Norway (872–1397)) Heine Brockdorf; Henry II

Units involved
Unknown	(Kingdom of Norway (872–1397)) Kalundborg garrison

Strength
Some ships Unknown amount of men	Many ships Unknown amount of men

Casualties and losses
Many ships deserted and enclosed	Unknown

The siege of Kalundborg (Danish: Belejringen af Kalundborg), also known as the siege of Kalundborg Castle, was a siege by Valdemar IV of Denmark on the Norwegian-pledged Kalundborg Castle in 1341 during the Kalundborg War, which is named after the siege. The Danes were forced to retreat after a surprise attack on the Danish camp by Henry II, Count of Holstein-Rendsburg.

== Background ==
In 1340, Valdemar IV of Denmark became king of a disunited and fragile Denmark. Denmark has previously been under the foreign rule of the German Count Gerhard III of Holstein-Rendsburg, and Valdemar now set about to reunite Denmark.

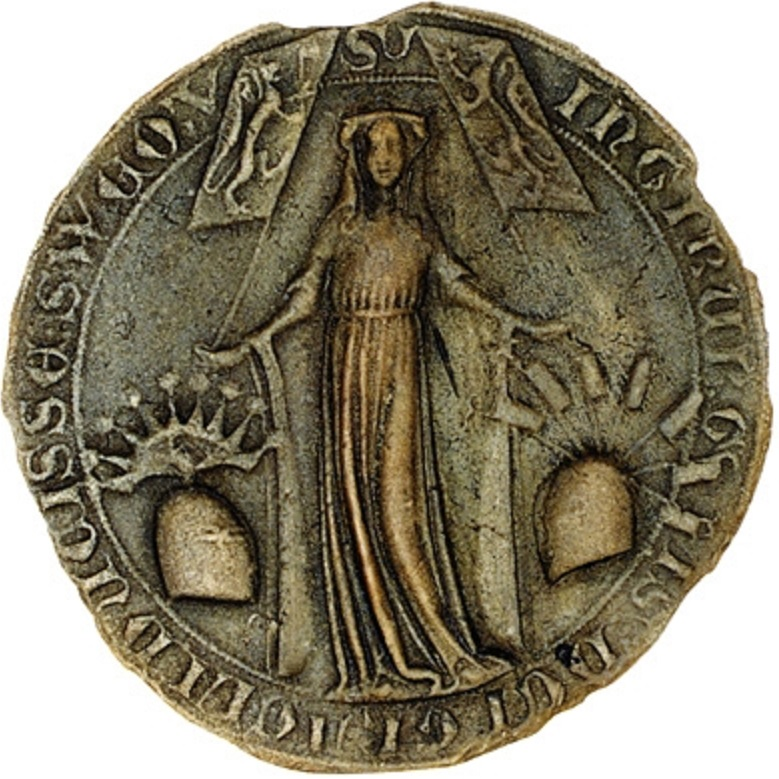
Seal of Duchess Ingeborg; Regent of Norway 1319–1327, Regent of Sweden 1318–1326. Also played a big political role after her regency.

Valdemar deemed Zealand to be the most important part of Denmark, and in 1341 he got control of Copenhagen which he could use as a base for further operations on Zealand.

On Zealand, the castle of Søborg and Kalundborg was mortgaged to Ingeborg of Norway, and these would be the first targets for Valdemar. Valdemar and his men marched to Kalundborg and had already started besieging the castle in mid-July 1341.

== Siege ==
During his besieging of Kalundborg, Valdemar managed to receive support from 5 Wendish–Hanseatic cities. In his camp, he made an alliance with the Wendish cities on 15 July, in which they received renewed ratification on their free letters, for helping Valdemar with warships during his siege. Additionally, Valdemar received support from Count John III of Holstein-Plön and Bishop Peder Jensen from the Archbishopric of Lund, who both promised to send ships to Valdemar's disposal.

However, without a declaration of war, Henry II, Count of Holstein-Rendsburg showed up at Kalundborg with many warships and fell over Valdemar's vessels, which either deserted the action or were enclosed. Seeing this, the garrison in the castle made an outcome out of the castle, and Valdemar was subsequently forced to abandon his siege.

== Aftermath ==
On 1 September, an agreement was made between the two parties, in which four men from each side would meet at Roskilde on Michaelmas to settle the feud between Ingeborg and Valdemar. However, the results of these negotiations are unknown.

== See also ==
- Siege of Kolding (1368–1369) – Siege in Denmark, 1369
- Niels Ebbesen – Danish folk hero (1308–1340)
- Siege of Skanderborg – 1340 siege in Denmark
- Gerhard III, Count of Holstein-Rendsburg – Count of Holstein-Rendsburg
- Battle of Nonnebjerg – 1340 battle in Denmark

== Works cited ==
- Bøgh, Anders (2024). "Valdemar Atterdag, ca. 1321-1375". danmarkshistorien.dk (in Danish).
- Reinhardt, Christian (1880). Valdemar Atterdag og hans Kongegjerning (in Danish). Gad.
- Sundberg, Ulf (1999). Medeltidens Svenska krig (in Swedish) (1st ed.). Stockholm: Hjalmarson & Högberg. pp. 147–149. ISBN 9189080262.
