= Siege of Kolding =

A Siege of Kolding may refer to:

- Siege of Kolding (1341) – 1341 siege in Denmark
- Siege of Kolding (1368–1369) – Siege in Denmark, 1369
- Siege of Kolding (1658) – 1658 battle

== See also ==
- Battle of Kolding (1644) – 1644 battle of the Torstenson War
- Battle of Kolding (1849) – Battle between Denmark and the German Confederation during the First Schleswig War
- Koldinghus – Danish royal castle
