= Siege of Skanderborg =

1340 siege in Denmark

- Part of Niels Ebbesen's rebellion
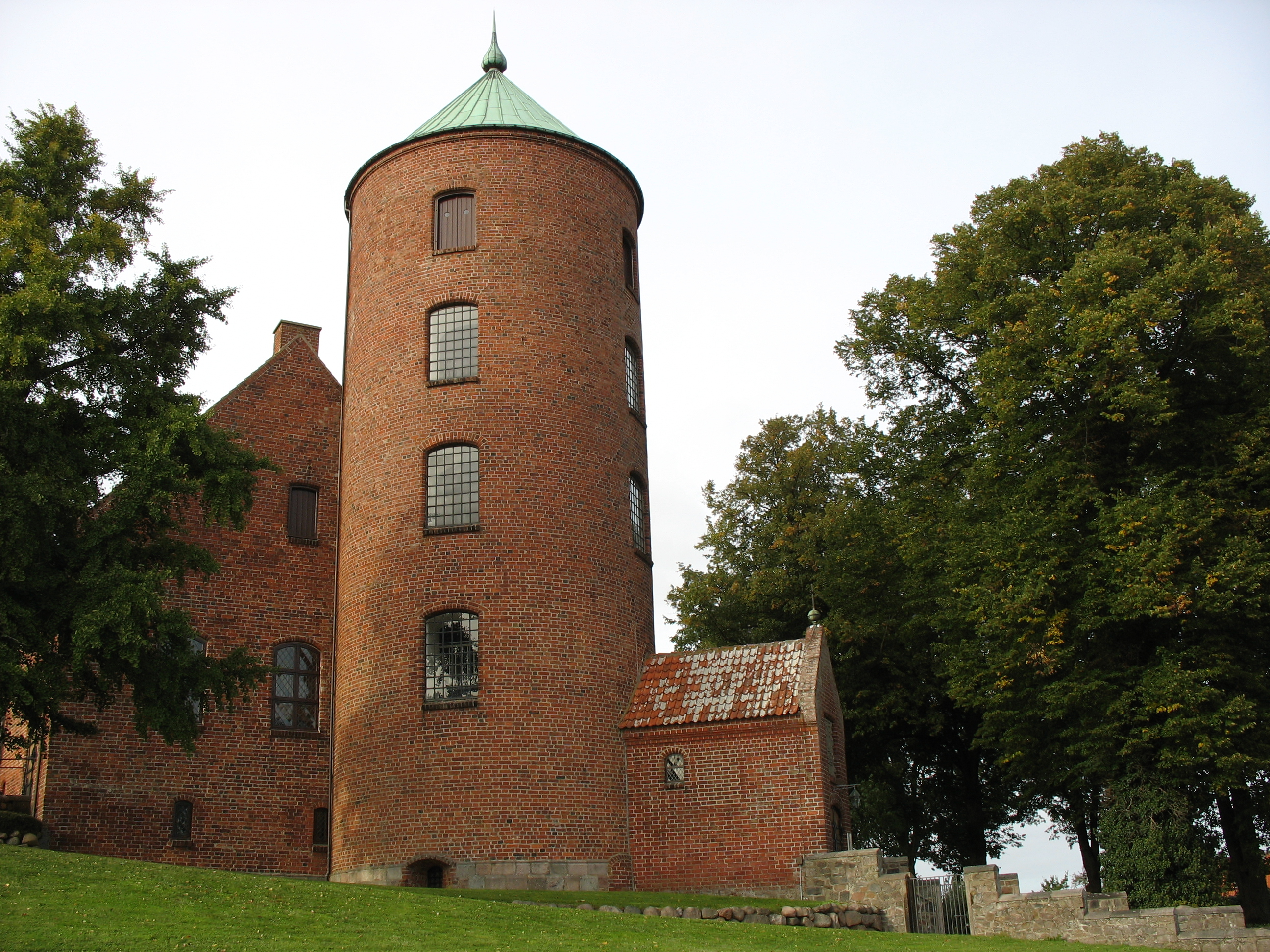
- The corner tower from Skanderborg Castle - now tower for the castle church, 2007.
Date	? – 2 November 1340
Location	Skanderborg Castle, Jutland 56°02′17″N 9°55′31″E
Result	Holsteinian victory
Territorial changes	Danish retreat

Belligerents
(Medieval Denmark) Jutish rebels	Holstein

Commanders and leaders
(Medieval Denmark) Niels Ebbesen	Markvard Rastorf

Units involved
(Medieval Denmark) Jutish peasants and cavalry	Skanderborg garrison

Strength
c. 2,000 men	Unknown

Casualties and losses
Unknown	Unknown

The siege of Skanderborg (Danish: belejringen af Skanderborg), alternatively the siege of Skanderborg Castle (Skanderborg Slot), was a siege of the Holsteinian-held Skanderborg Castle in Jutland by Jutish rebels led by Niels Ebbesen. Despite being close to surrendering, the Holsteinian garrison received a relief force led by Henry II of Holstein-Rendsburg and defeated the Danes in the Battle of Nonnebjerg on 2 November 1340.

== Background ==
In the early 14th century, Denmark was effectively subjugated to foreign powers, with Count Gerhard III of Holstein-Rendsburg exercising dominion over a significant portion of the country by the 1330s. However, a group of 50 Jutes, led by minor nobleman Niels Ebbesen, who were furious with the current regime, took matters into their own hands in 1340. They ambushed and assassinated Count Gerhard in Randers, a move that sent shockwaves throughout the country. In the aftermath, Ebbesen and his followers escaped through a bridge, fleeing south across the Gudenå to the Skjern River.

At Skjern River, Ebbesen and his men stormed a Holsteinian fort construction possibly near present-day Skjern, and killed a great number of Germans. After this, Ebbesen continued his revolt, seeking the important castle of Skanderborg.

== Siege ==
In late 1340, Ebbesen had reached Skanderborg with a force of 2000 men, and he now began initiating a siege of the Castle. The commander of the castle, Markcard Rastorf, held strongly out. The siege dragged on for a long time, and the besieged Holsteinian crew looked to be surrendering the castle soon because of a lack of food. However, with the intent to free the castle from German rule, Ebbesen would now be surprised: the surrounded garrison had meanwhile sent a message of help to the dead Count's son, Henry II, Count of Holstein-Rendsburg. Henry (nickname Iron Henry) would in subsequently send a professional force of 600 cavalry to Skander, in order to relieve the besieged. When the relief force arrived, Ebbesen quickly retreated from the siege on 2 November and went out on open terrain with the Holsteinian army pursuing.

== Aftermath ==
The opposing forces met at a hill outside Skanderborg and engaged in an open battle. The battle was stubborn, however, the Danes would be defeated, and Ebbesen and his brothers, together with 2200 Danes, were killed in the battle. Despite the defeat, the unification of Denmark, and the fight against the Holsteinian foreigners would continue under Valdemar IV of Denmark.

== See also ==
- Battle of Lundenæs – 1340 battle in Denmark
- Siege of Kolding (1368–1369) – Siege in Denmark, 1369
- Siege of Vordingborg – Siege between the Hanseatic League and Denmark between 1368–1370
- Siege of Copenhagen (1368) – Siege and looting of Copenhagen by Hanseatic forces in 1368

== Works cited ==
- Pajung, Stefan (2024). "Valdemar Atterdag". Den Store Danske.
- Dzeko, Nedim (2011). "Niels Ebbesen, ca. 1300-1340". Danmarkshistorien.
- Flaskager, Elmo (2023). "Lundenæs Slot". Skjern Udviklingsforum (in Danish).
- Reinhardt, Christian (1880). Valdemar Atterdag og hans Kongegjerning (in Danish). Gad.
- Suhm, Peter Frederik (1826). Historie af Danmark: Fra Aar 1340 til 1375 (in Danish). Jens Hostrup Schulz.
