= Battle of Lundenæs =

1340 battle in Denmark

- Part of Niels Ebbesen's Rebellion
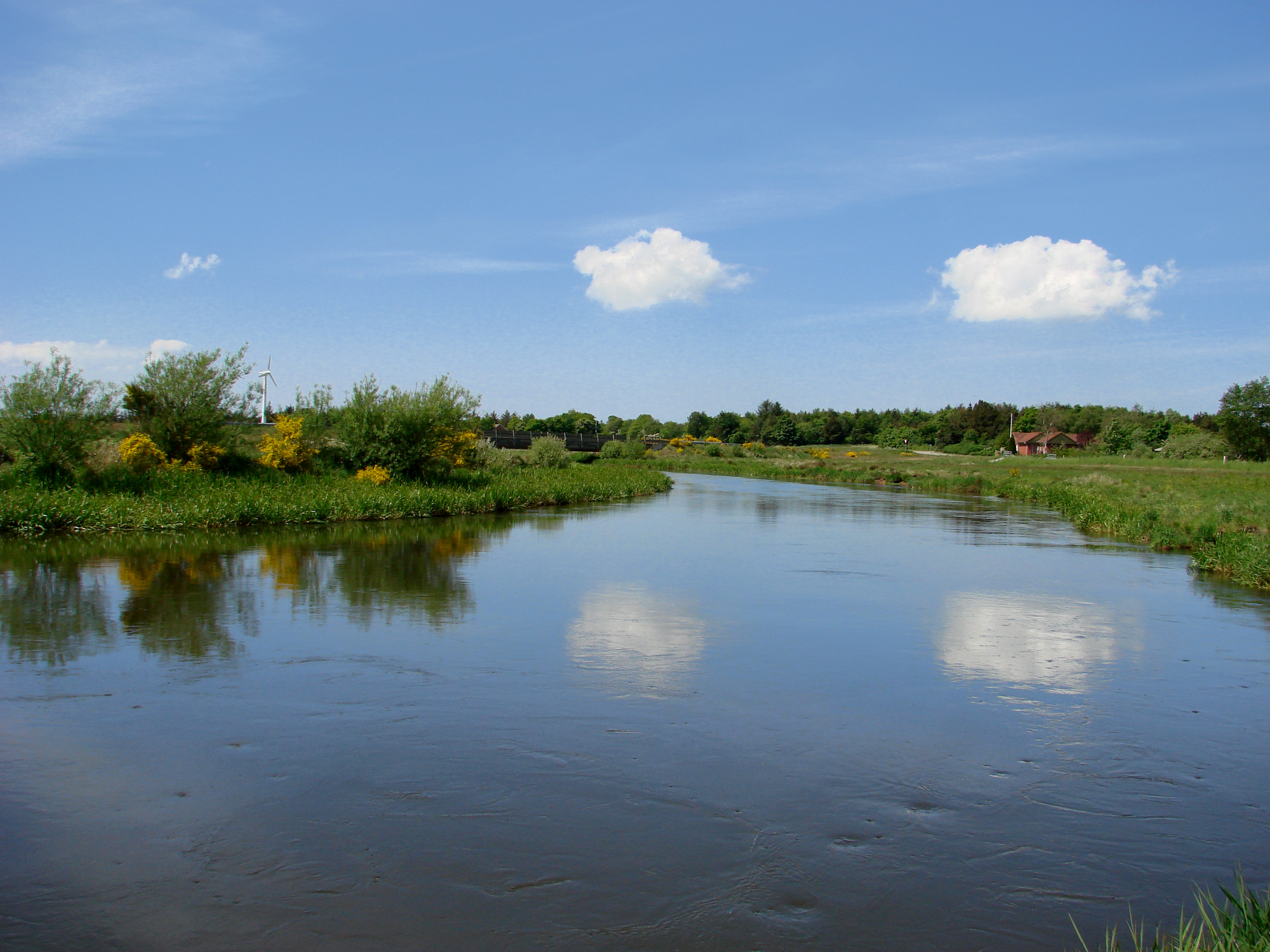
- Picture of Skjern River close to Lundenæs, 2018.
| Date | 2 May 1340 |
| Location | Disputed (see § Place of Battle) 55°57′04″N 08°33′51″E |
| Result | Jutish rebel victory |
| Territorial changes | Most of West Jutland falls in control of Niels Ebbesen |

Belligerents
| (Medieval Denmark) Jutish rebels | Holstein |

Commanders and leaders
| (Medieval Denmark) Niels Ebbesen | Unknown |

Units involved
| (Medieval Denmark) Jutish knights | Lundenæs garrison |

Strength
| Unknown | Unknown |

Casualties and losses
| Unknown | Large amount killed |

The Battle of Lundenæs (Danish: Slaget ved Lundenæs), also known as the Battle of Skjern River (Danish: Slaget ved Skjern Å) was a military engagement between Holsteinian and Jutish rebel forces on 2 May 1340 possibly at Lundenæs Castle near Skjern River in the then Holsteinian-held Jutland. The battle ended in a Jutish rebel victory and it is alleged that many Germans died in the Skirmish.

== Background ==
During the early 14th century, Denmark was mortgaged off to foreign rulers including Count Gerhard III of Holstein-Rendsburg, who by the 1330s ruled much of Denmark. In 1340, 50 rebelling Jutes under Niels Ebbesen, who were furious with the current regime, assassinated Count Gerhard in Randers. After the assassination, Ebbesen and his men fled south over the Gudenå and west to the Skjern River.

== Battle ==
Ebbesen reached Lundenæs in Bølling county on 2 May 1340. Here the Holsteinians were concurrently fortifying and building a castle to act as a base against the Danish rebels. Ebbesen and his Jutish men stormed and assaulted the constructions of the fortification in what would be described as a great battle. Ebbesen and the Jutes came out victorious and as a result, many Holsteinians were said to have lost their lives or fled in action, and the Holsteinian attempt to erect a castle failed.

== Aftermath ==
After this battle, Ebbesen and his revolt likely controlled most of Jutland, except the larger castles and cities. Ebbesen and his men may even have participated in the meeting at Viborg and hailed the newly elected Valdemar IV of Denmark the same year. Despite this success, Ebbesen was killed in the Battle of Nonnebjerg the same year.

== Place of Battle ==
There has been raised uncertainty about the place of the battle. According to the Chronica Jutensis Niels Ebbesen after the killing of Count Gerhard in Randers "Same year, on 2 May killed ... many Germans at Skjern River, where they were about to build a castle against the Danes". This has since then been interpreted to take place near Lundenæs Castle.

However, in 2010 Anders Bøgh and Carsten Porskrog Rasmussen working for Jysk Arkæologisk Selskab raised uncertainty about the place of battle. The two writers suggest that the Chronica Jutensis is referring to Nørreå River, which is located between Viborg and Randers.

Considering that Niels Ebbesen's other known war activities are linked to East Jutland, where he committed his murder in Randers and fell during the siege of Skanderborg on 2 November 1340, it is quite likely that it was in Skjern parish that the Germans were by building a castle, and that we have the first mention of a castle on the site

— Anders Bøgh & Carsten Porskrog Rasmussen

This theory has been met with critique from among others Poul Grinder-Hansen at Nationalmuseet, who argues that Bøgh and Rasmussen do not support their claim efficiently enough. Nevertheless, the battle tells us much about the conditions in Jutland until Valdemar IV took over.

== Legacy ==
In February 1933, Scheel Pousel tried to get Skjern Museumsforeningen to raise a memorial stone for the 600-year jubilee of the Danish victory, however, this would never be accomplished.

== See also ==
- Gerhard III, Count of Holstein-Rendsburg – Count of Holstein-Rendsburg
- Siege of Kolding (1368–1369) – Siege in Denmark, 1369
- Niels Ebbesen – Danish folk hero (1308–1340)
- Siege of Skanderborg – 1340 siege in Denmark

== Works cited ==
- Pajung, Stefan (2024). "Valdemar Atterdag". Den Store Danske.
- Dzeko, Nedim (2011). "Niels Ebbesen, ca. 1300-1340". Danmarkshistorien.
- Reinhardt, Christian (1880). Valdemar Atterdag og hans Kongegjerning (in Danish). Gad.
- Olsen, Rikke Agnete (2014-10-20). Danish Medieval Castles. Aarhus Universitetsforlag. ISBN 978-87-7184-007-0.
- Flaskager, Elmo (2023). "Lundenæs Slot". Skjern Udviklingsforum (in Danish).
