= Nymindegab =

Coordinates: 55°49′N 8°11′E

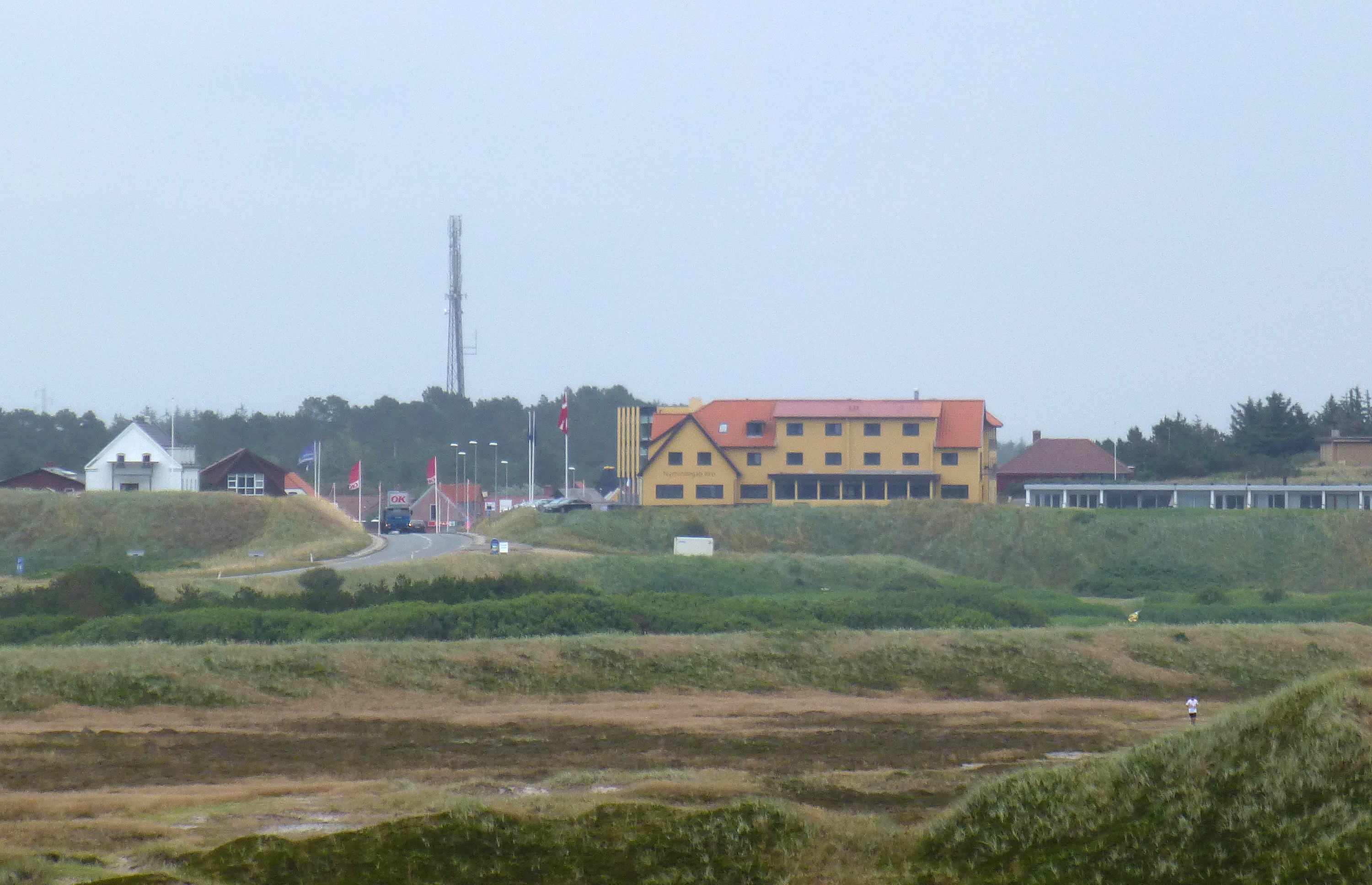

Nymindegab lies in Southwest Jutland, Denmark, and is a former fishing village by the former outflow at the southern end of Ringkøbing Fjord. In the summer, it is a well-attended tourist town with a permanent population of 204 (1 January 2024). It is located in Varde Municipality and belongs to Region of Southern Denmark. The town is situated at the southern end of the isthmus of Holmsland Dunes, which demarcates the fjord from the North Sea. Just northeast of Nymindegab lies the bird reservation of Tipperne on a peninsula in Ringkøbing Fjord.

In Nymindegab there is a Nymindegab Museum, where one can see, among other things, a whale skeleton, pictures from the area, and nature depicted by artists who have remained in the area over time. At Nymindegab Rescue Station one can see Denmark's oldest lifeboat, which from 1966 was kept at the National Museum of Denmark in Copenhagen, but was returned to Nymindegab in 1977.

== See also ==
- Nymindegab Museum
