= Skjern =

Skjern may refer to:

- Skjern, Denmark, a railway town in western Jutland, Denmark
- Skjern Municipality, a former municipality in Region Midtjylland in west Denmark
- Skjern River, the largest river in Denmark by volume
