= Nymindegab Museum =

Coordinates: 55.8170°N 8.1974°E

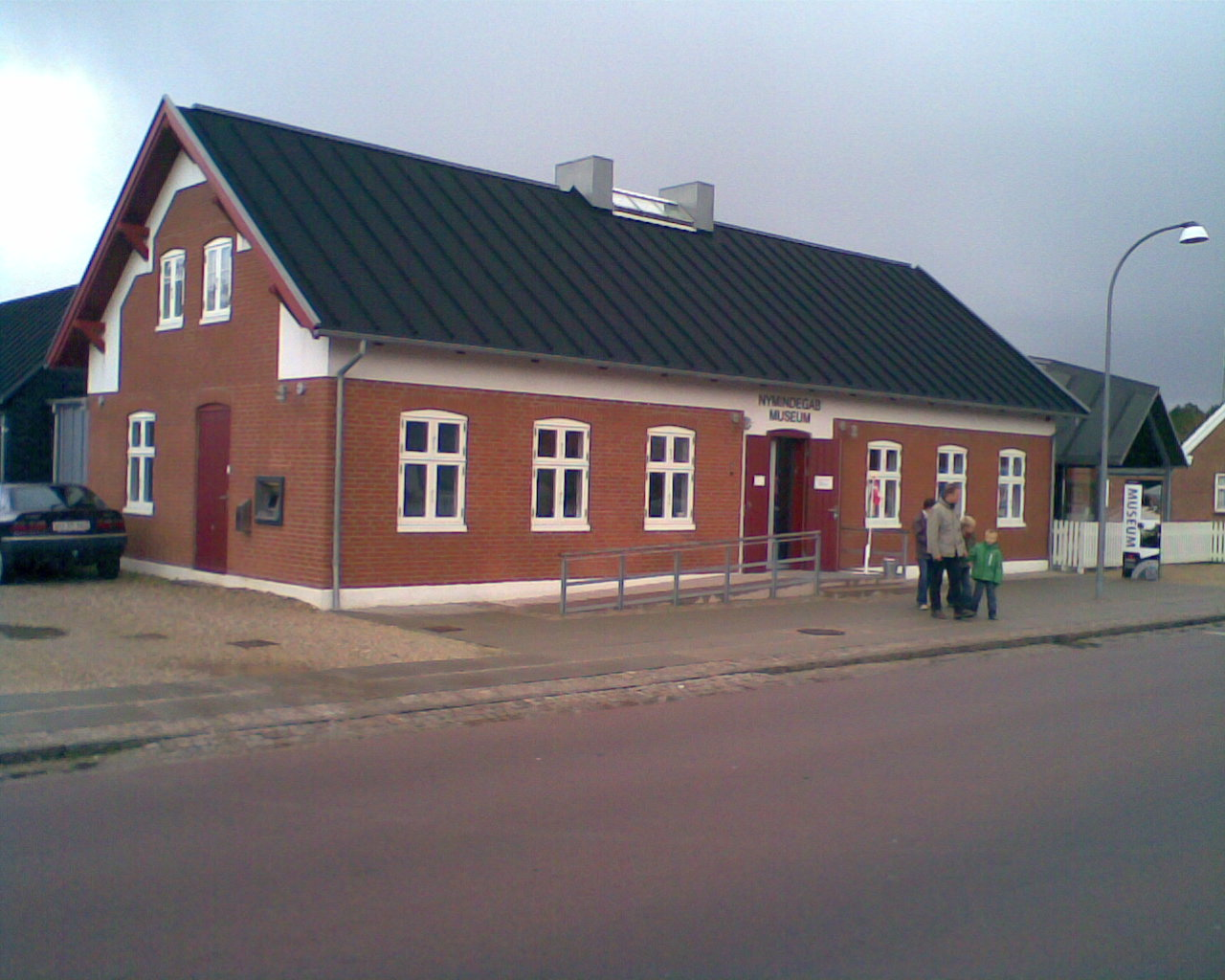
Nymindegab Museum

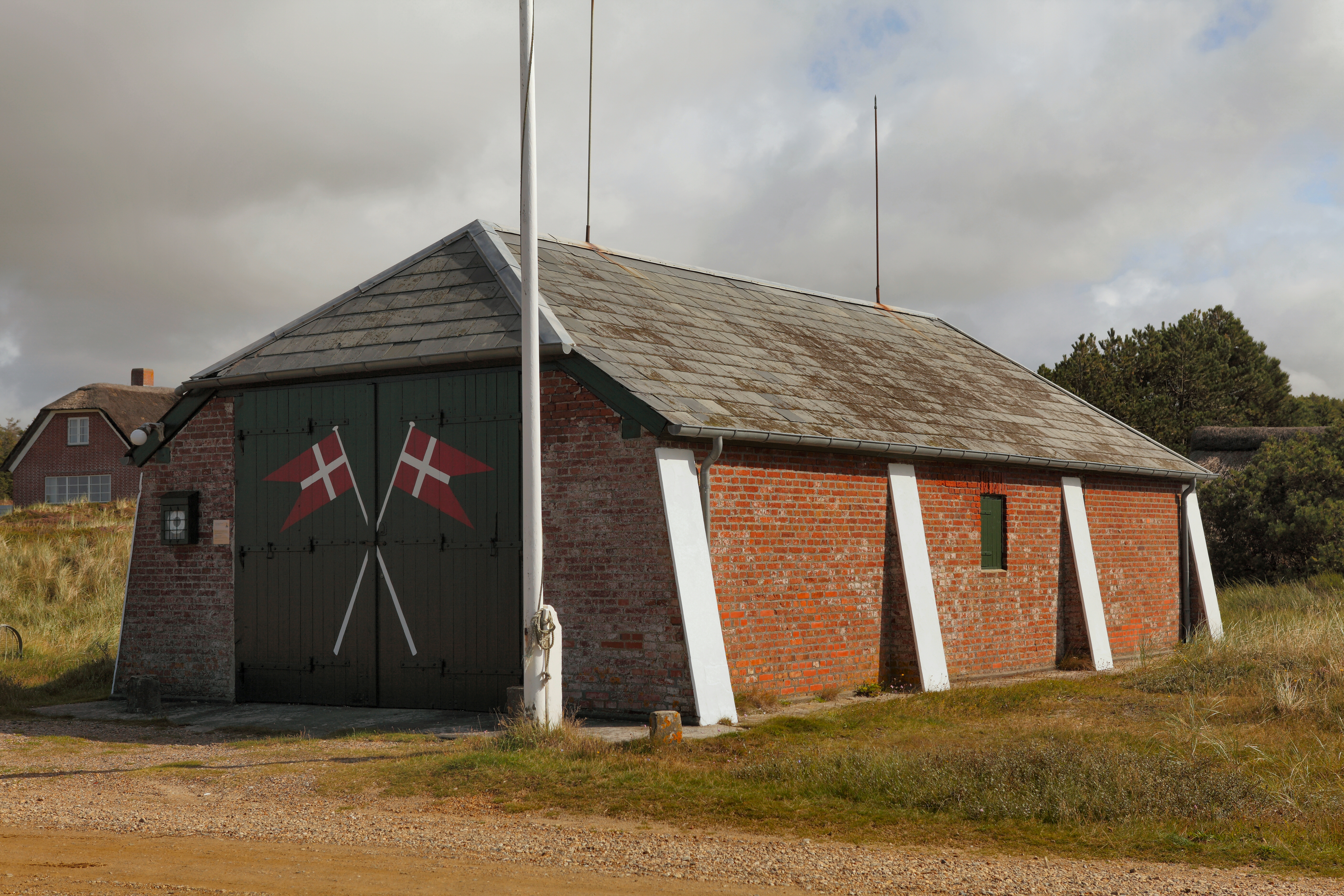
Nymindegab Rescue Station

Nymindegab Museum is a local history and art museum located at Nymindegab in Varde Municipality, Denmark. It is operated by Varde Museum (Vardemuseerne) together with the small museum at the former Nymindegab Rescue Station.

== History ==
The museum includes the small house of the family of a local carpenter. The dwelling is from the 1930s, and includes a reconstruction of a buried vegetable garden. In earlier times one dug a large hole in the vegetable garden, which then was partially filled up with humic mulch. In this way the crop yield was sheltered, and the mulch was not blown away. In addition, the museum is about to restore an antique sawmill.

The museum contains an archeological collection with finds from the excavation at Lønne including textile remnants and burial gifts. From Viking times one can find, among other things, posts from a bridge in Nybro from the year 761. From more recent times there are exhibitions on navigation, fishing, wrecks and rescuing, and from the very latest times, tourism on the west coast.

The museum does not refer to itself as an art museum, but also illustrates the story with approx. 200 paintings. The museum's art collection includes a wide range of images from local artists and artist associated with the region including: Johannes Larsen (1867–1961), Carl Trier Aagaard (1890–1961), Laurits Tuxen (1853–1927) and Christen Lyngbo (1871-1968).

The museum also exhibits a whale house with the skeleton of a nearly 12-meter-long sperm whale that was stranded by Nymindegab in 1990.

== Gallery ==
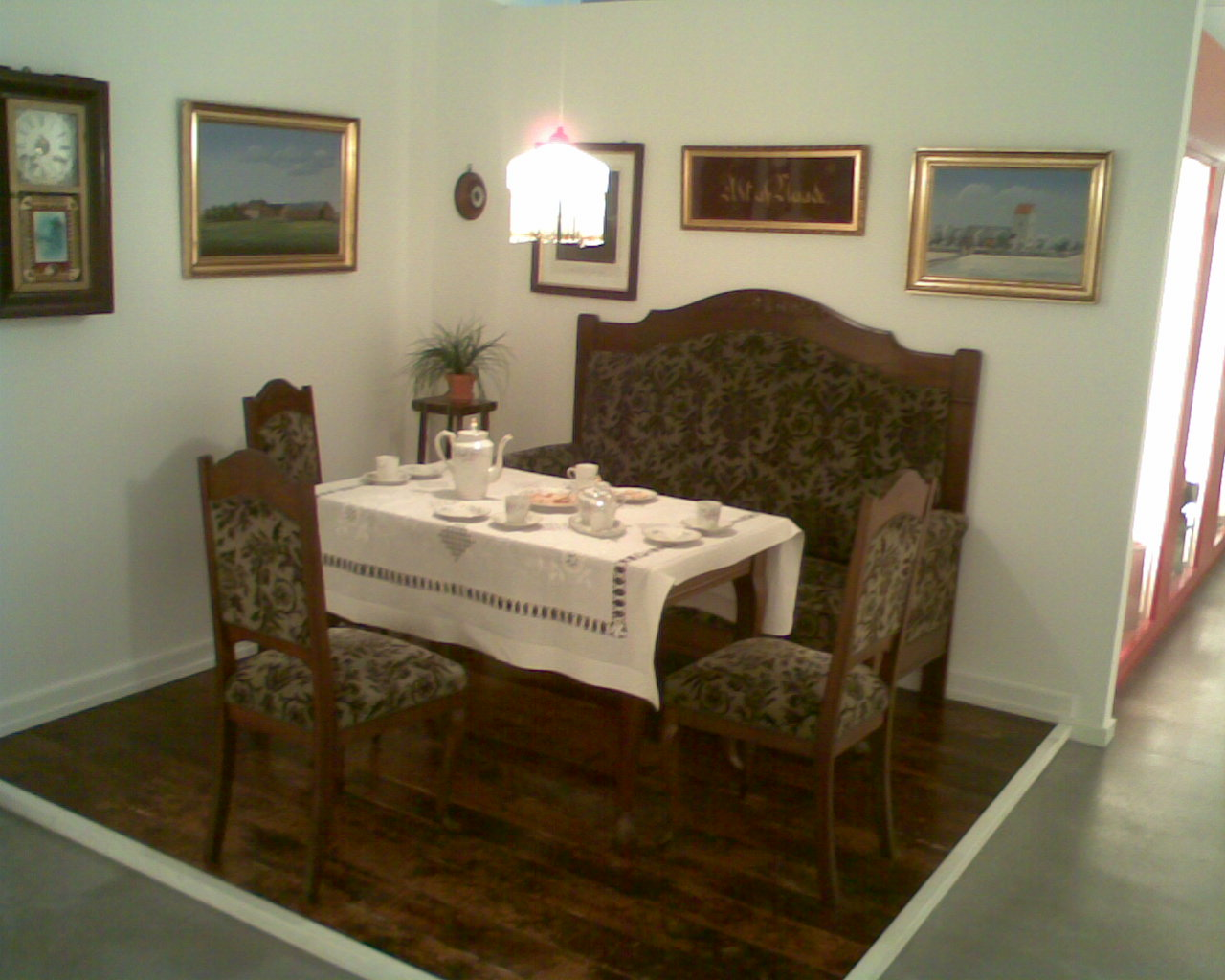
Dining room

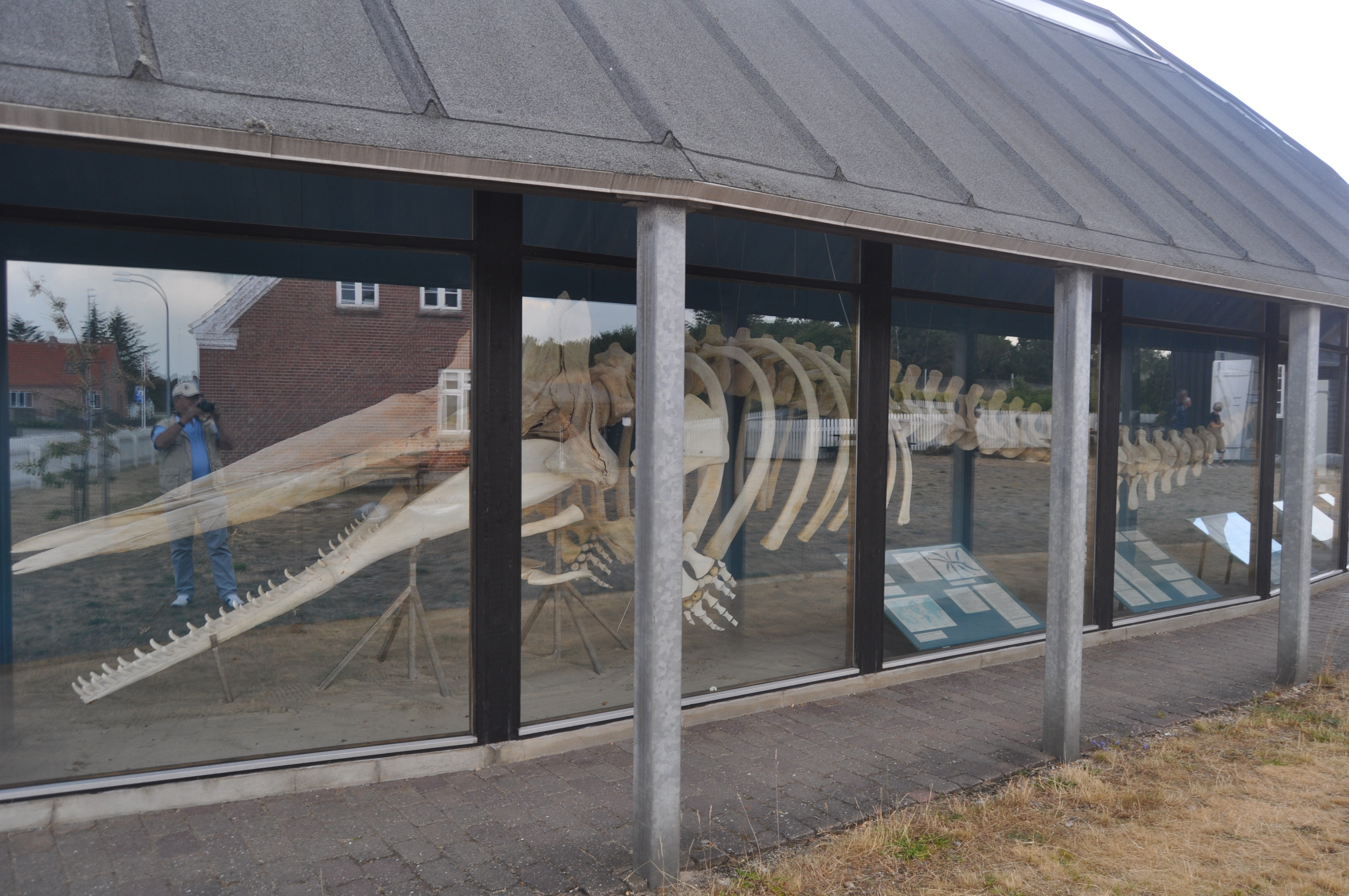
Whale house exhibit

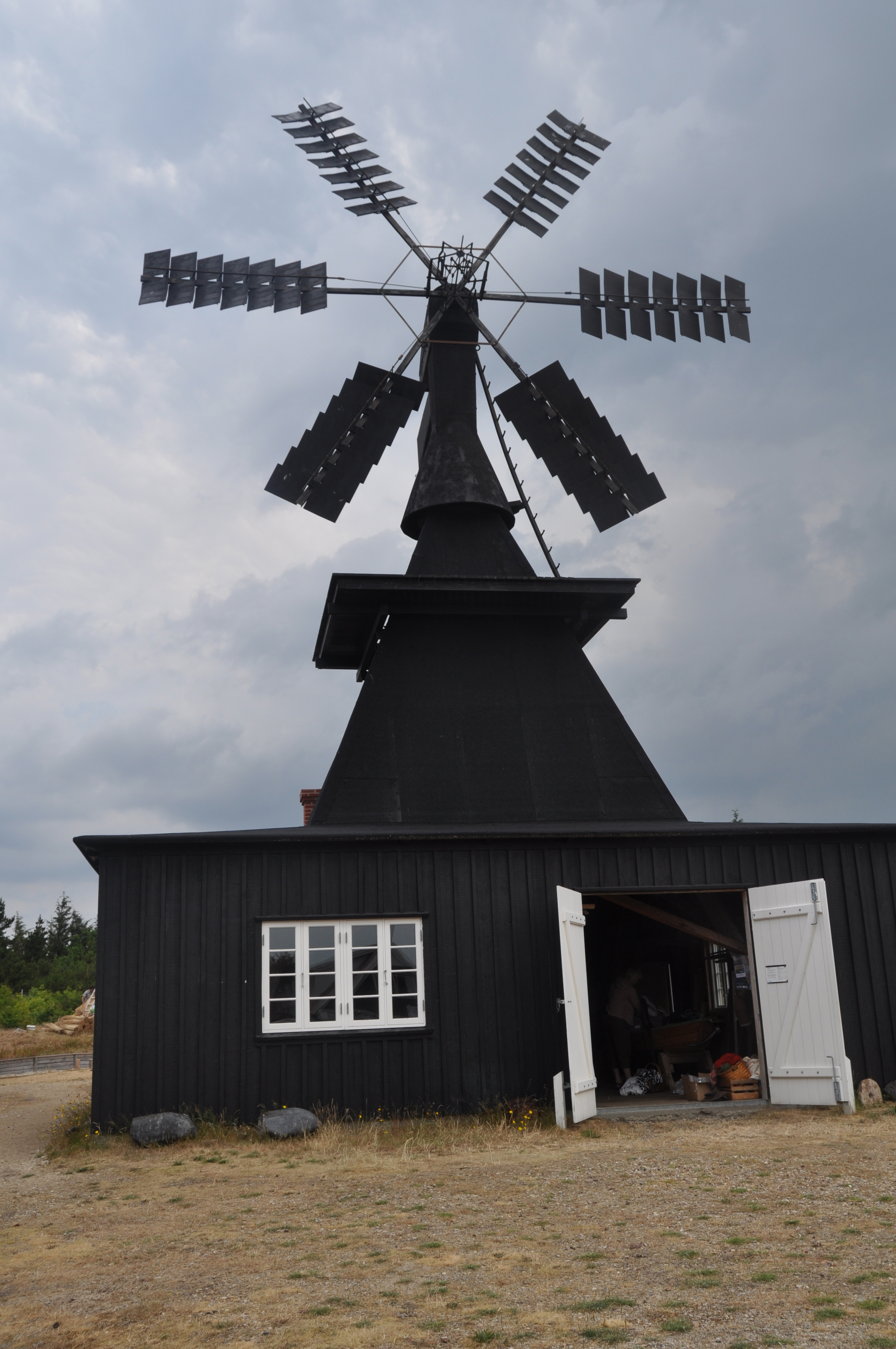
Sawmill and workshop
