= Ringkøbing Fjord =

Coordinates: 56°00′N 8°15′E

Designations

Ramsar Wetland
- Designated: 2 September 1977
- Reference no.: 141

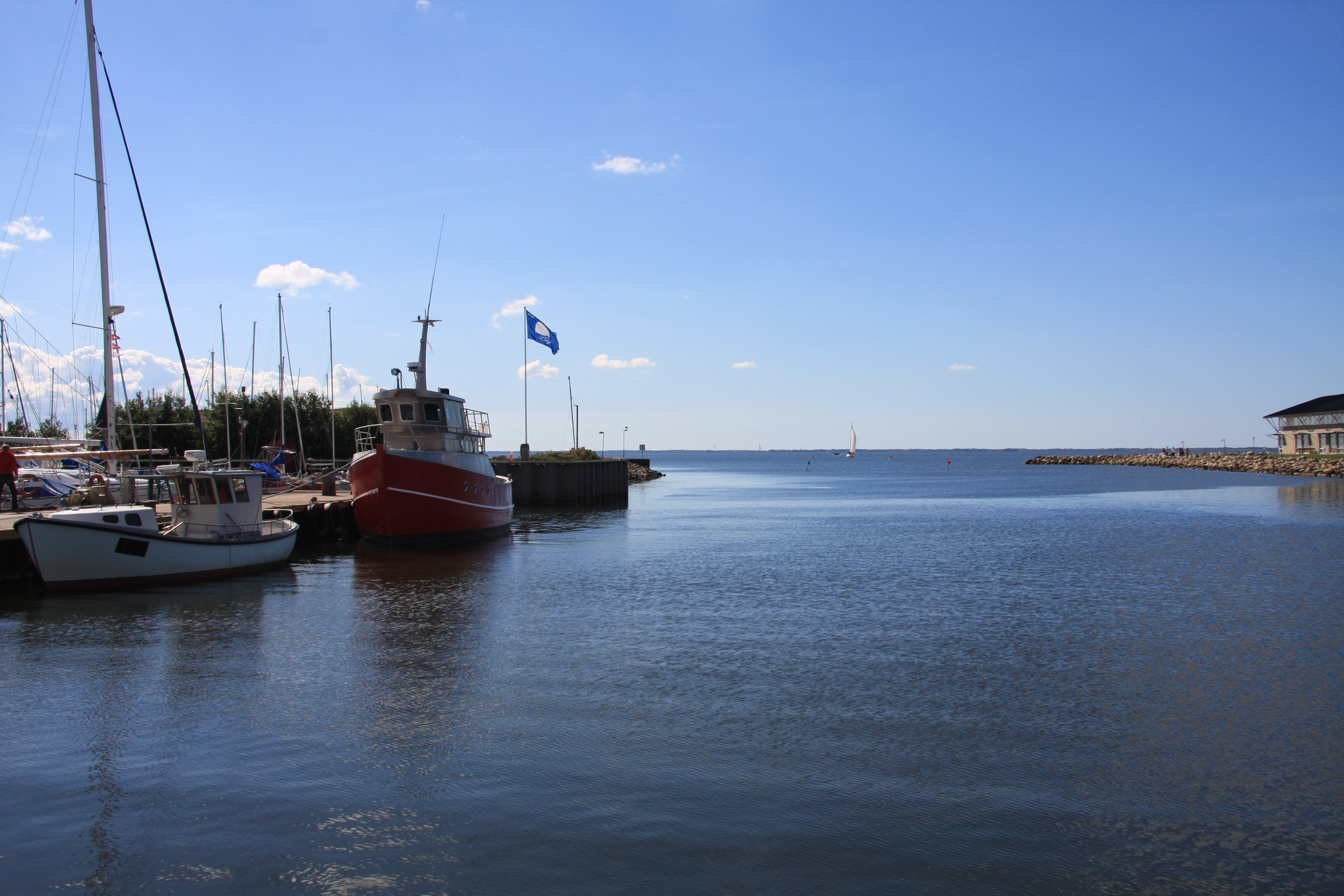
Ringkøbing Fjord seen from Ringkøbing.

Ringkøbing Fjord, despite its name, is in fact a shallow lagoon on the west coast of Jutland.

Skjern River terminates in Ringkøbing Fjord with a large river delta system to the east, and the lagoon is shielded from the North Sea by a long isthmus named Holmsland Dunes to the west. On the Hvide Sande Canal in the middle of the isthmus, there is a floodgate that provides access to the sea to the west. The fjord is about 30 kilometers long and 2 to 3 meters deep with an area of almost 300 square kilometers (115 square miles). In the southwestern corner is the Tipperne peninsula, where there is a bird reservation. The town of Ringkøbing lies to the north-east. Ringkøbing Fjord was once affected by oxygen depletion, but today both plant and fish life abounds.

Ringkøbing Fjord was originally a bay, around which two sandbars have gradually built up, with a sandbank that has shifted repeatedly over time as a result of shifting water currents. In the mid-17th century, the bank was near Sønder Havrvig, but it gradually moved south as sand was deposited on the shoal from the north. By the late 18th century, it was close to the town of Nymindegab. On several occasions, the surrounding dunes collapsed from the effects of the water, causing the old outflow to fill with sand and creating problems for local fisherman. In 1891, a channel was therefore dug south of Nymindegab but, in 1910, it was replaced by a channel in Hvide Sande. A storm surge in 1911 created an opening of 230 meters and extensive flooding around the fjord. In 1915, the passage at the southern end of the fjord was therefore reopened while the one near Hvide Sande was closed. It was, however, later reopened with the establishment of a lock in 1931.

== Literature ==
- Erik Johannesen (1997): "Danmark Nu", Høst & Søn
