= Battle of Nonnebjerg =

1340 battle in Denmark

Battle of Nonnebjerget
- Part of Niels Ebbesen's Rebellion
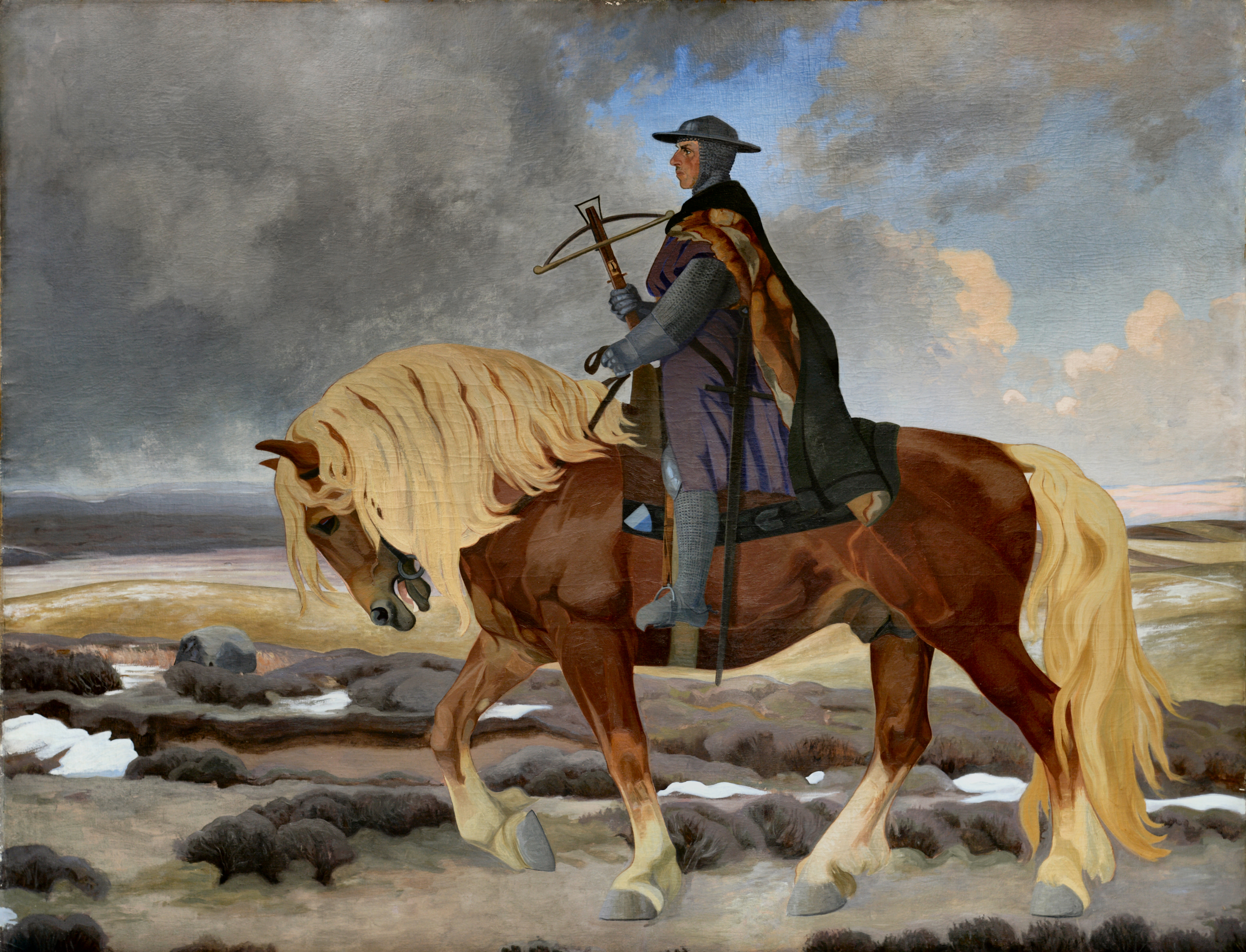
- Niels Ebbesen, the leader of the Danish rebellion, on his horse, by Agnes Slott-Møller in 1894.
Date	2 November 1340
Location	Nonnebjerget, near Skanderborg, Jutland 56°02′17″N 9°55′31″E
Result	Holsteinian victory (see §Aftermath)
Territorial changes	Danish retreat

Belligerents
Holstein	(Medieval Denmark) Jutish rebels

Commanders and leaders
Henry II; Markvard Rastorf	(Medieval Denmark) Niels Ebbesen †

Units involved
Skanderborg garrison Relief force	(Medieval Denmark) Jutish peasants and knights

Strength
+600 men	c. 2.000 men

Casualties and losses
Unknown	2-000–2.200 killed

The Battle of Nonnebjerg (Danish: Slaget ved Nonnebjerget), also known as the Battle of Skanderborg (Danish: Slaget ved Skanderborg) and the Battle of Marbjerg (Danish: Slaget ved Marbjerg), was a battle near Skanderborg Castle on 2 November 1340 between Holsteinian and Danish rebel forces. The result is generally considered a German victory, with the Danish rebel leader, Niels Ebbesen being killed in action.

== Background ==
In the early 14th century, Denmark was under the control of foreign powers, with Count Gerhard III of Holstein-Rendsburg overseeing a large portion of the country by the 1330s. However, in 1340, a group of 50 Jutes, led by Niels Ebbesen, a minor nobleman, launched a surprise attack on Count Gerhard in Randers, resulting in his assassination which sent shockwaves throughout the country. In the aftermath, Ebbesen and his followers fled south across the Gudenå River, using a bridge to escape.

As they continued their revolt further south, Ebbesen and his men stormed a Holsteinian fortification located near present-day Skjern, killing many Germans. Next, Ebbesen sought to capture the strategically important Skanderborg Castle.

=== Prelude ===
While besieging Skanderborg, the besieged Germans received help from a relief force of 600 professional knights, and the Danes were now surrounded on both fronts.

== Battle ==
On a hill outside Skanderborg, the two sides met in open terrain. The Danish force consisted of roughly 2,000 peasants and knights, while the German force was made up of armed knights and cavalry. The ensuing battle was bloody and hard fought and ultimately resulted in the Jutish peasants fleeing and were ousted. Subsequently, the Danish landlords and knights, seeing the now superior German forces, decided to surrender. A massive bloodbath followed with up to 2,200 Danes killed, including Ebbesen and his two brothers.

== Aftermath ==
According to the Lübeck Chronicle, the Danish bodies were dismembered and put on wheels and pillars by the Holsteinian, which may have been interpreted as revenge for the assassination of their father, Gerhard III, Count of Holstein-Rendsburg, and given as food for the birds.

According to the Chronica Jutensis, the Danes won the battle, however, it agrees with the Lübeck Chronicle that Niels Ebbesen died in the battle. According to the Chronica Sialandie, another final battle should have taken place at Manbjerg.

== Legacy ==
As a memory of the battle of death of Niels Ebbesen, there has been raised a memorial stone in Skanderborg near European route E75. It was raised a couple of years after the Second Schleswig War, when anti-Germanisation was at its highest in Denmark. Additionally, N. F. S. Grundtvig has also published a psalm on Ebbesen's revolt and fall in 1839.

== See also ==
- Siege of Kolding (1368–1369) – Siege in Denmark, 1369
- Siege of Vordingborg – Siege between the Hanseatic League and Denmark between 1368–1370
- Siege of Copenhagen (1368) – Siege and looting of Copenhagen by Hanseatic forces in 1368
- Battle of Lundenæs – 1340 battle in Denmark

== Works cited ==
- Dzeko, Nedim (2011). "Niels Ebbesen, ca. 1300-1340". Danmarkshistorien.
- Flaskager, Elmo (2023). "Lundenæs Slot". Skjern Udviklingsforum (in Danish).
- Havsteen, Hans Erik; Olling, Anders Asbjørn (2018). Kongerækken: Valdemar Atterdag (in Danish). Lindhardt og Ringhof. ISBN 978-87-11-91557-8.
- Pajung, Stefan (2024). "Valdemar Atterdag". Den Store Danske.
- Reinhardt, Christian (1880). Valdemar Atterdag og hans Kongegjerning (in Danish). Gad.
- Olsen, Rikke Agnete (2014). Danish Medieval Castles. Aarhus Universitetsforlag. ISBN 978-87-7184-007-0.
- Suhm, Peter Frederik (1826). Historie af Danmark: Fra Aar 1340 til 1375 (in Danish). Jens Hostrup Schulz.
