= Tipperne =

Coordinates: 55°52′0″N 8°13′48″E

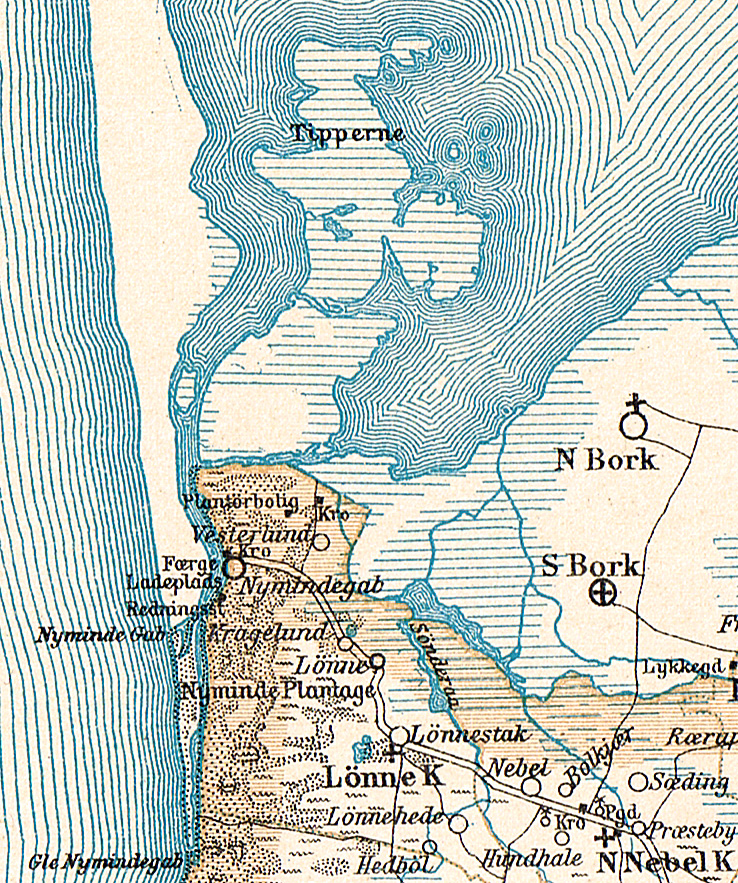
Tipperne at the end of the 1800s; the peninsula has grown a good deal on the east side since then.

Tipperne and Værneengene is a peninsula that is located in the southern end of Ringkøbing Fjord (Ringkøbing-Skjern Municipality, Region Midtjylland), on the west coast of Jutland, Denmark. The area, an important stopover for migratory birds, was created by sand deposits and is only a few hundred years old. It has been publicly owned since the latter half of the 18th century, and in 1898 provisions on conservation were introduced to protect the rich bird life in the area. In 1928 a bird reservation was established and a groundskeeper was hired.

The reserve, which falls under the control of Denmark's Environmental Ministry and is managed by the Danish Forest and Nature Agency (Danish: Skov- og Naturstyrelsen) via Oxbøl Statsskovdistrikt, has a total area of about 2,200 ha, of which about 1,500 ha are shallow water areas around the peninsula. Tipperne is part of a larger conservation of Ringkøbing Fjord, which is also designated as a Ramsar wetland, that is, an international area of importance for waterfowl in accordance with the Ramsar Convention and EF's bird protection directive.

So that the birds may have peace and quiet, Tipperne is normally closed to the public. However, there are exceptions, usually on Sunday mornings.

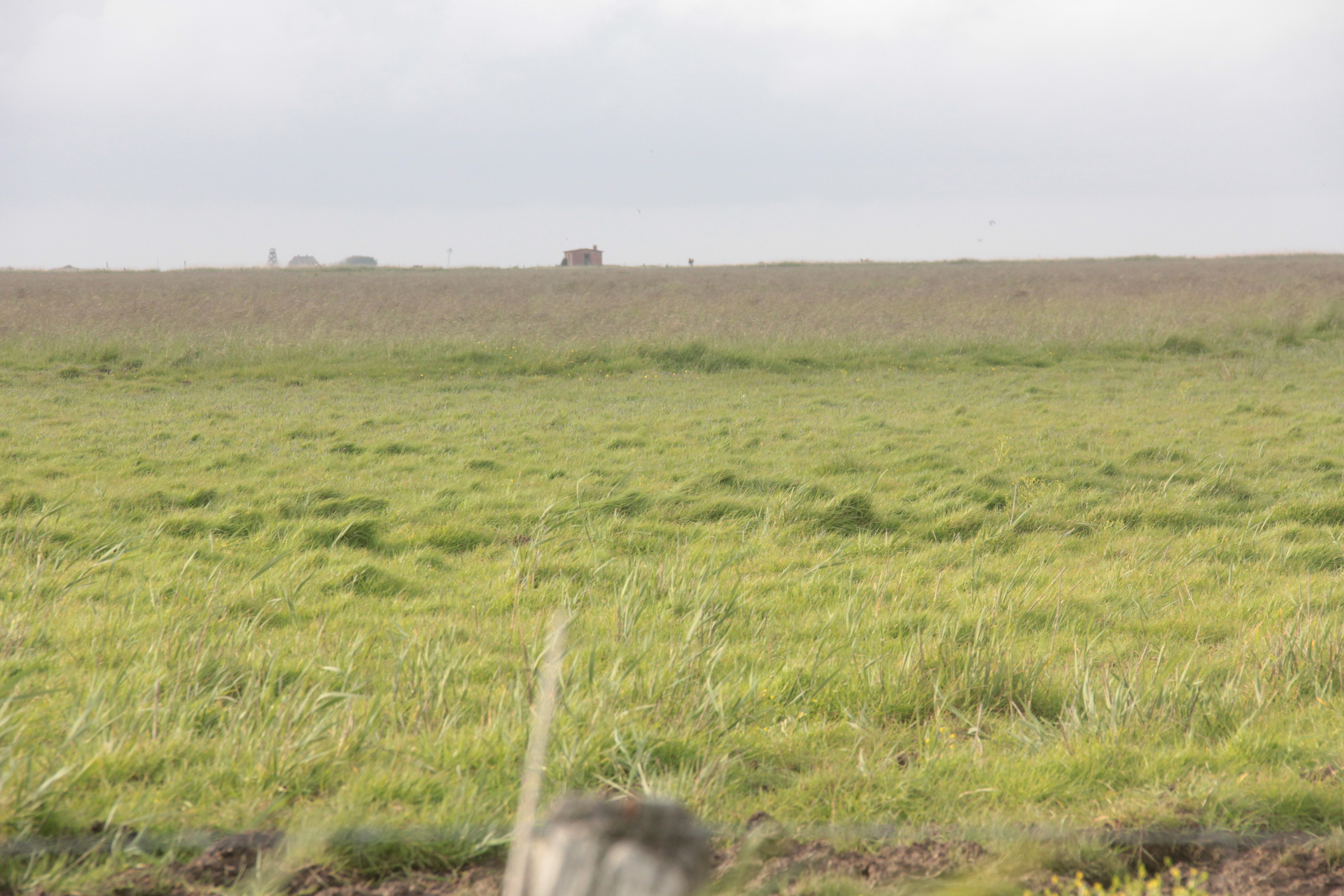
Tipperne at Ringkøbing Fiord

== External links and references ==
- Forest and Nature Administration's page on Tipperne
- Bird and Nature's page on Tipperne
