= Niels Ebbesen =

Danish folk hero (1308–1340)

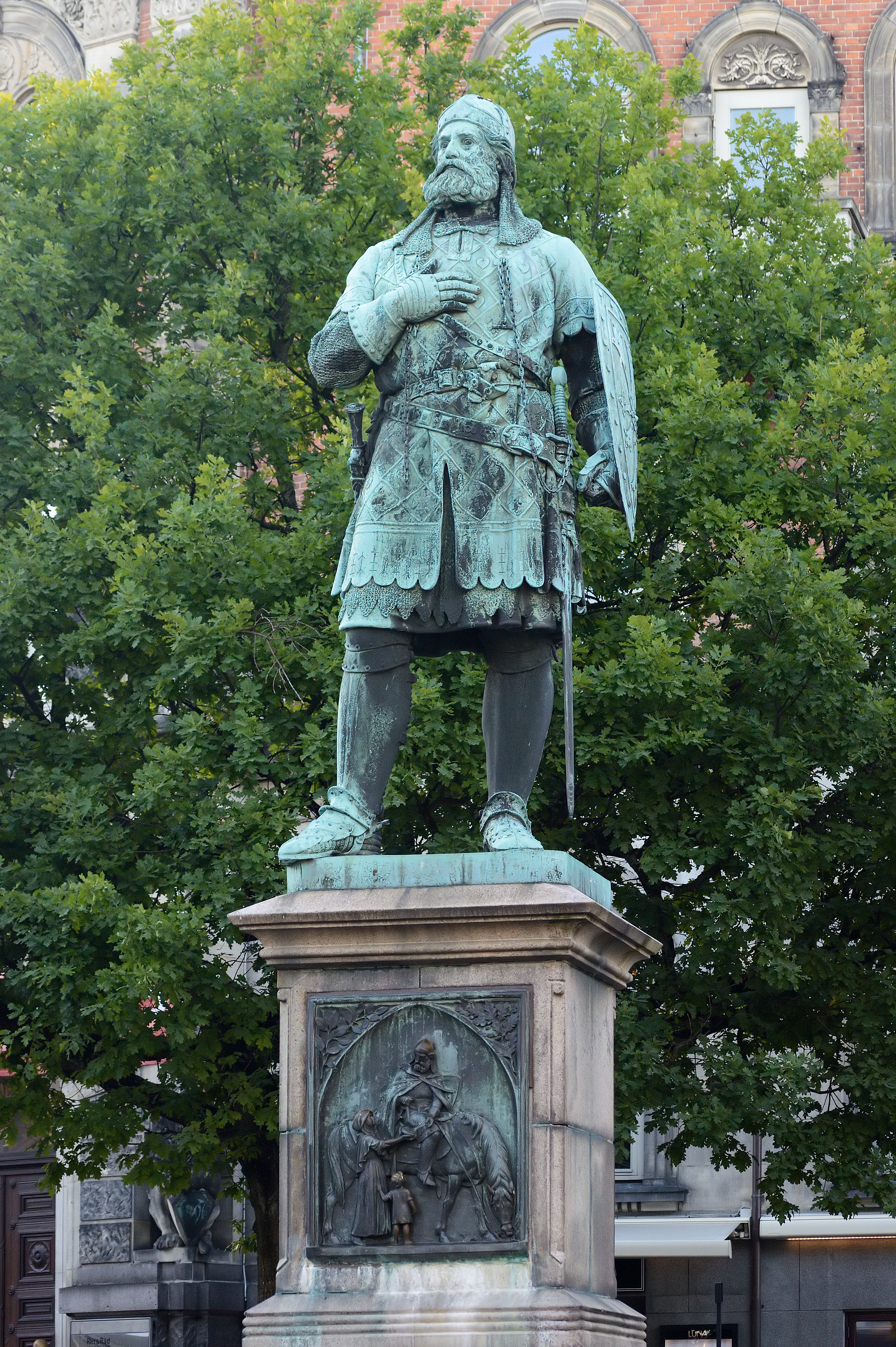
- Statue of Niels Ebbesen, erected in 1882, standing in front of the old town hall in Randers, Denmark.
- Born: 1308
- Died: 2 November 1340 (aged 31–32)

Niels Ebbesen (1308 – 21 November 1340) was a Danish squire and national hero, known for assassinating Gerhard III, Count of Holstein-Rendsburg in 1340. From 1332 to 1340, Count Gerhard was the lord of both Jutland and Funen. His death meant the end of Holstein rule in Denmark.

== Biography ==
Little is known of Ebbesen's background. He seems to have belonged to the Jutland gentry. Like many other of his class, he probably supported the Holstein occupiers during the years of chaos, but later turned against them and when Count Gerhard campaigned in Jutland in 1340, Ebbesen supported the Jutland guerrillas.

On 1 April 1340, Ebbesen and 47 of his warriors entered Randers and hid until nightfall. They got into the Count's headquarters and entered his bedroom. They cut off the count's head over the end of the bed. Not wishing for the act to be secret, Ebbesen's men beat a drum and shouted that the Count had been executed. When the Holsteiners gave chase, Ebbesen and his men fled toward the bridge over the River Guden. Svend Trøst, one of Ebbesen's men, had weakened the bridge, and as soon as Ebbesen and his followers had crossed, they pulled the bridge down and made their escape, losing just a single man.

During the following rebellion, Niels Ebbesen played a main role in the resistance and defeated the Germans at Skjern River, but he was killed the same year during a fight against the Germans. 2,000 Danes laid siege to Skanderborg Castle in April 1340. A relief force of 600 German knights and a simultaneous attack from the castle drove the Danes back into their wagon fortress on Nun Hill. The ring of wagons was breached, and Ebbesen and his men were surrounded and butchered by the Germans.

== Legacy ==
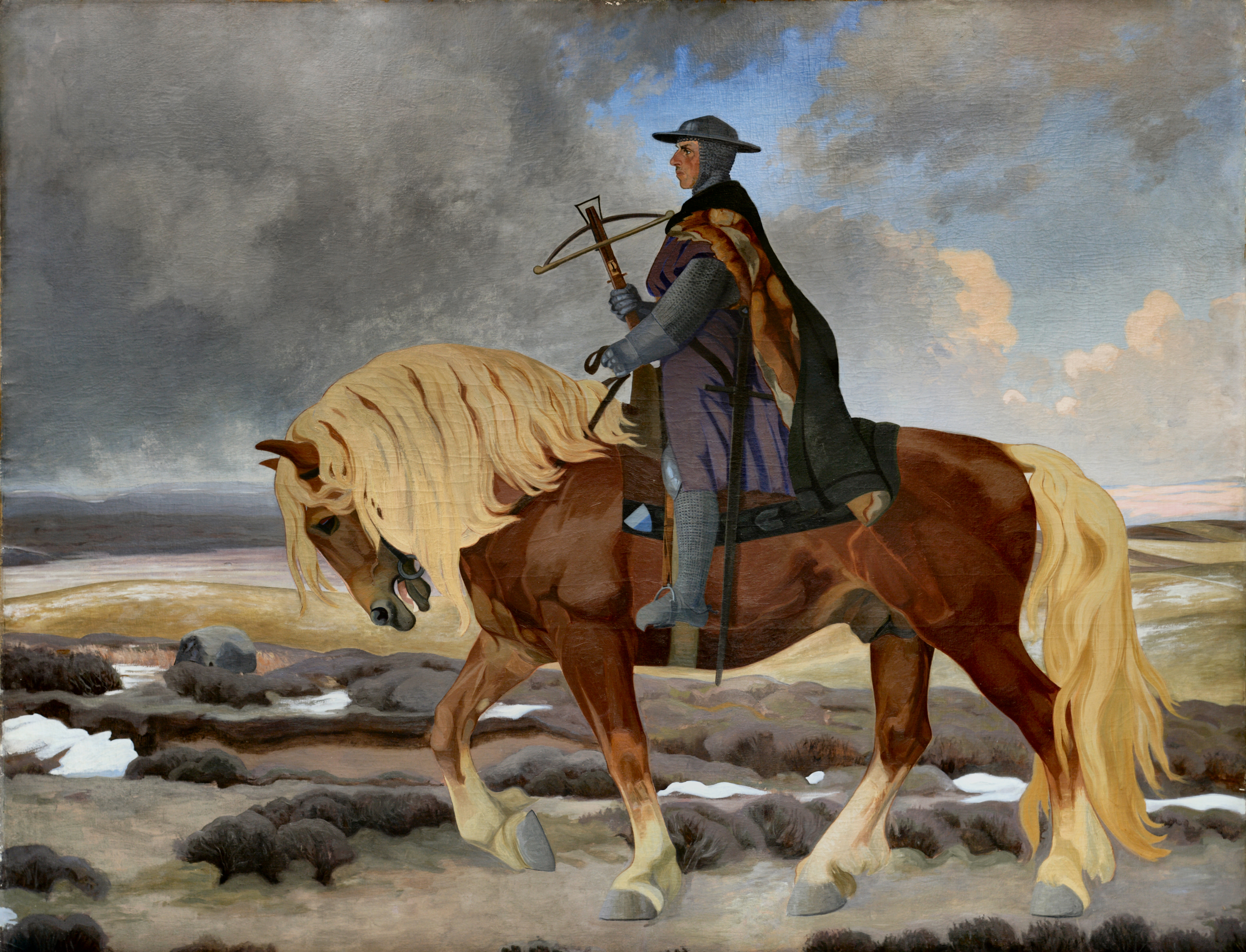
Niels Ebbesen, painted by Agnes Slott-Møller in 1893–1894, Randers Museum of Art

Traditionally, Niels Ebbesen has been regarded one of the great heroes of medieval Danish history and one of the symbols of Danish nationality. His actions marked the beginning of the liberation of Denmark. Yet others disapproved of his act, regarding it as simply murder. Whether his motives were purely national or partly private is impossible to know. This has not prevented both romantic Danish poetry and modern ballads from praising him as a freedom fighter.

A memorial to Niels Ebbesen and his followers was first erected in 1878 at Skanderborg. The Visbycross of stone with a bronze sword was designed by the sculptor Louis Hasselriis (1844–1912)

A statue of Niels Ebbesen was erected in 1882 at Randers. It was designed by the sculptor Ferdinand Edvard Ring (1829–1886).

A ballad (DgF 156, "Niels Ebbesen") dealing with the killing of Count Gerhard by Ebbesen was translated into English in Alexander Gray's Historical Ballads of Denmark (Edinburgh University Press, 1958).

In 1942, during the German occupation of Denmark in the Second World War, a play about Ebbesen's rebellion was written by the dramatist Kaj Munk (1898–1944). The Nazi occupiers banned the play and murdered its playwright.

A number of streets across Denmark has also been named after Ebbesen, including Niels Ebbesens Vej in Frederiksberg, Niels Ebbesens Gade in Aalborg and Niels Ebbesens Gade in Randers.

== Other sources ==
- Dansk Biografisk Leksikon, vol. 4, Copenh. 1980.
- Politikens Danmarkshistorie, vol. 4 by Erik Kjersgaard, Copenh. 1962.
- Jyske Krønike, transl. by Rikke Agnete Olsen. Aarhus, 1995.
