= Koldinghus =

Danish royal castle

Coordinates: 55°29′30″N 9°28′27″E

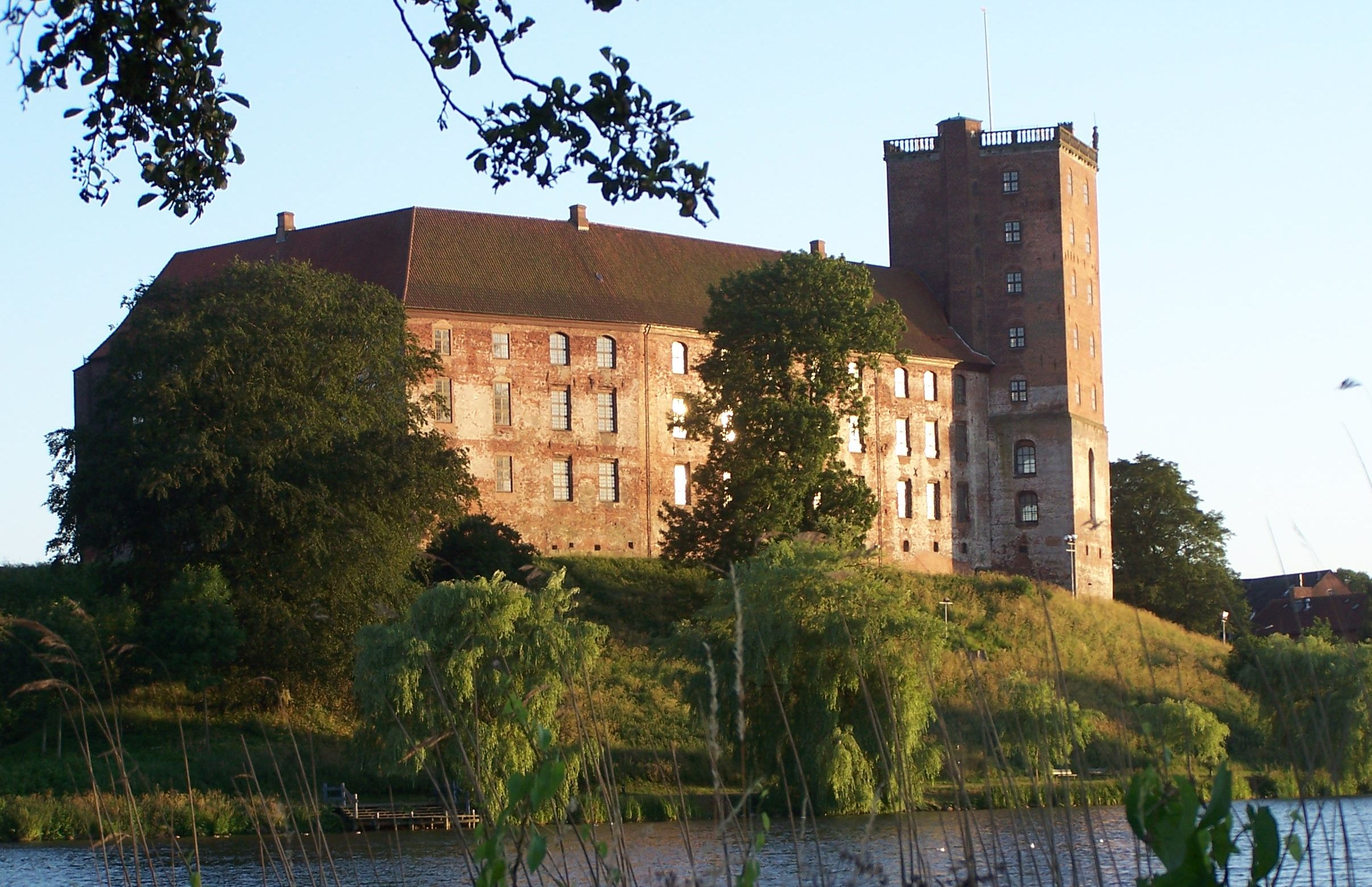
Koldinghus from the north

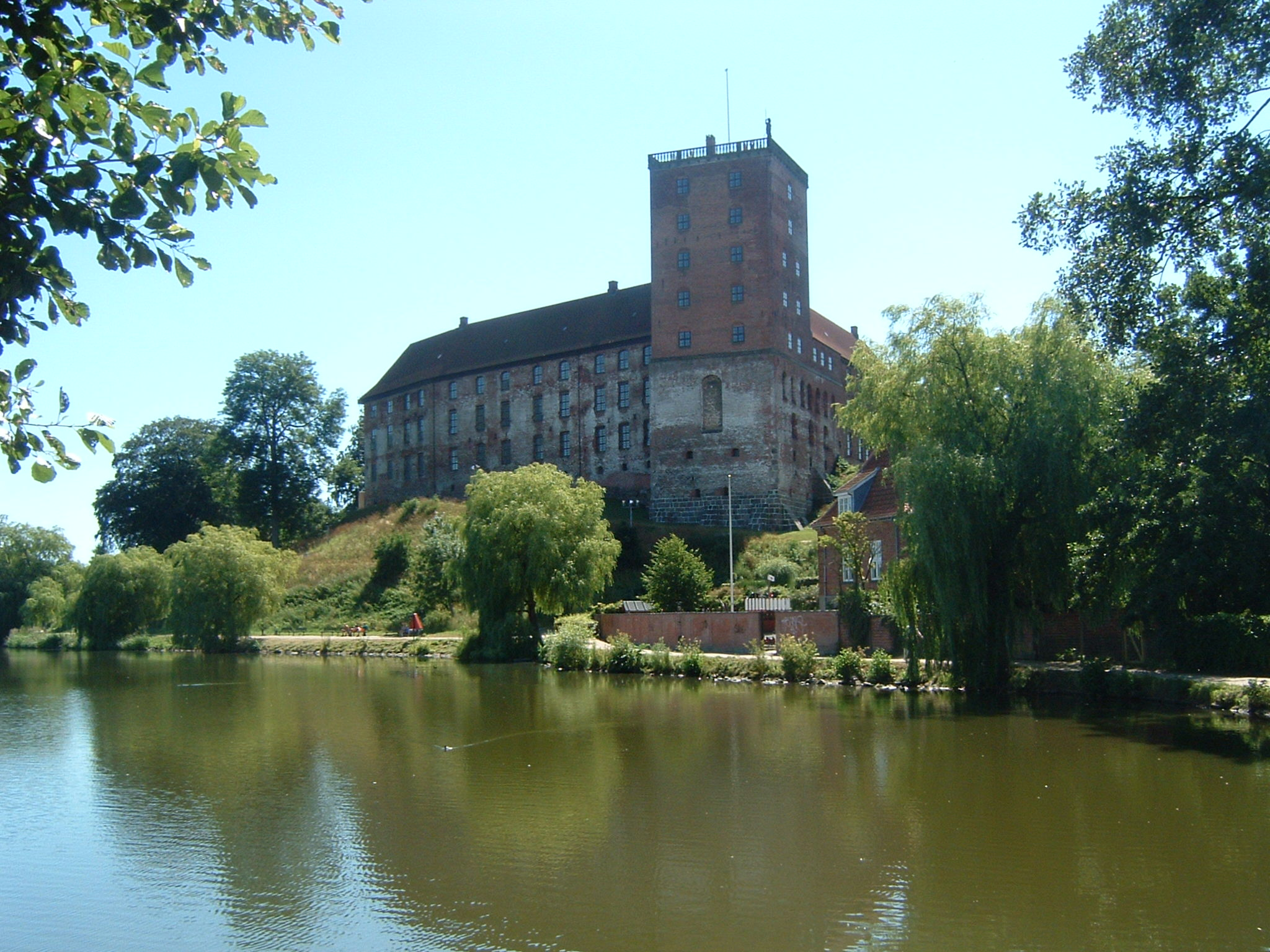
Koldinghus seen from over Slotssøen

Koldinghus is a Danish royal castle in the town of Kolding on the south central part of the Jutland peninsula. The castle was founded in the 13th century and was expanded since with many functions ranging from fortress, royal residency, ruin, museum, and the location of numerous wartime negotiations.

Today the restored castle functions as a museum containing collections of furniture from the 16th century to present, Roman and Gothic church culture, older Danish paintings, crafts focused on ceramics and silver and shifting thematized exhibitions. Koldinghus is managed by the Museum at Koldinghus which was established in 1890.

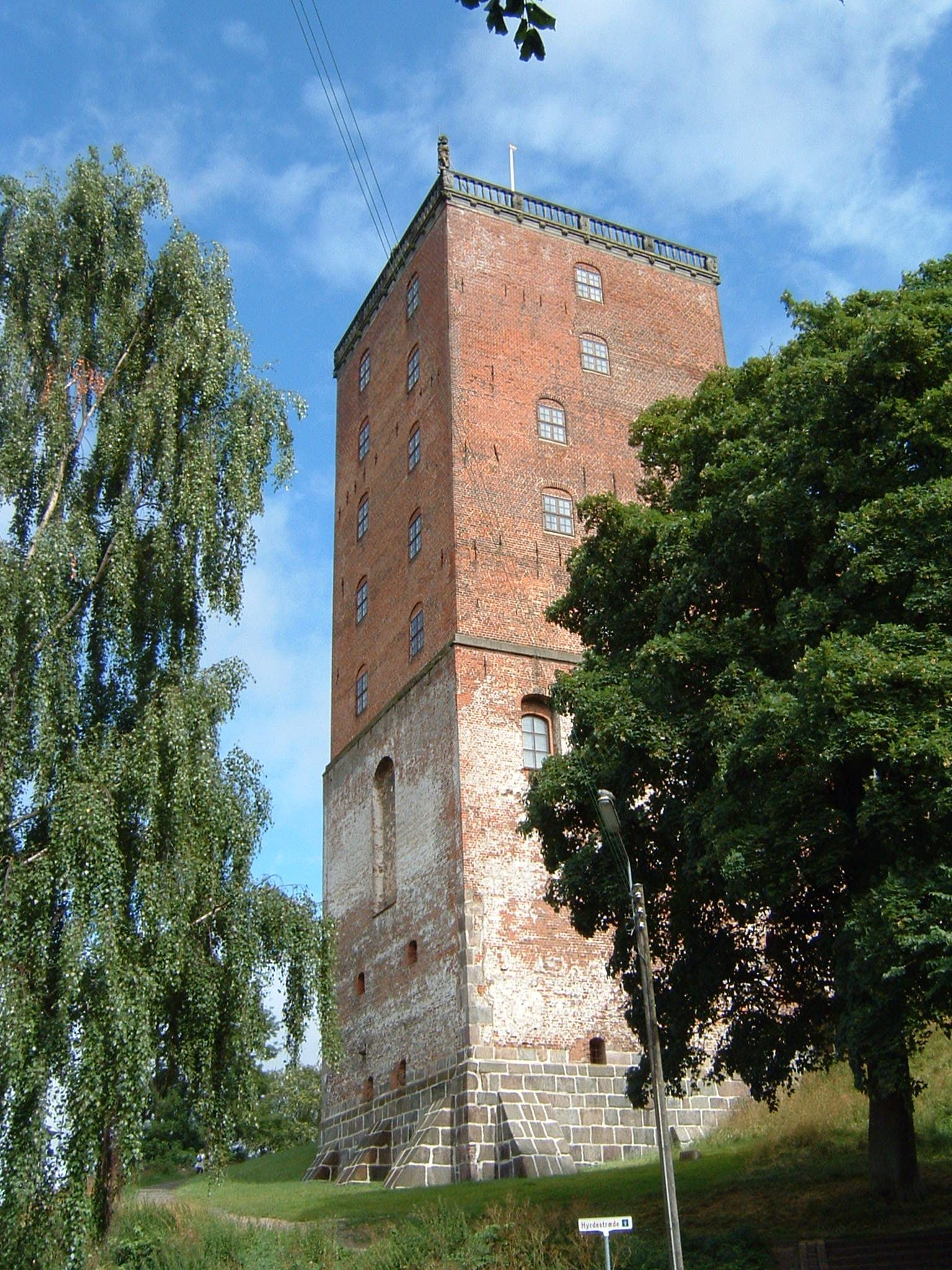
Koldinghus tower

== History ==
The oldest remaining part of castle is the north side facing the castle lake originally built by King Christoffer III (1441–1448). In 1341, and from 1368 to 1369 the castle would be besieged by Holstein and Jutish rebels. The western side was later built by King Christian I (1448–1481). King Christian III (1503–1559) built the south side and the small towers in the courtyard.

In 1252 Abel, King of Denmark (1218–1252) was killed during an expedition to Friesland leaving the Danish kingdom without a leader. The natural order of things would be to elect Valdemar III, Duke of Schleswig as king however he was in a prison cell in Cologne. This prompted the election of Abel's brother, Christoffer I, as the new king. After King Christoffer I was murdered in 1259, his son Eric V of Denmark (1249–1286) was elected king. Eric was just ten years old at the time and faced claims to the throne from the sons of King Abel of Slesvig led by Eric I, Duke of Schleswig.

Several wars between the king of Denmark and the Duke of Schleswig ensued until it was finally decided to build a fortress to defend the southern borders against its troublesome neighbour. It was in the context of this dynastic intrigue that Koldinghus was built. At Kolding, a hill in the centre of the town was chosen as the site for a castle. A moat was dug and wooden palisades erected. This was later to become Koldinghus.

== Expansion ==
In the 16th century cannons became more frequent tools of war and thick walled fortresses like Koldinghus partly lost their defensive significance. For this reason King Christian III added several buildings to the fortress and eventually turned it into a royal residence. The new residence became popular among the royal family and Prince Frederick, the heir apparent, grew up at Koldinghus. Christian III sometimes held court at the castle and it was here on 1 January 1559 that he died.

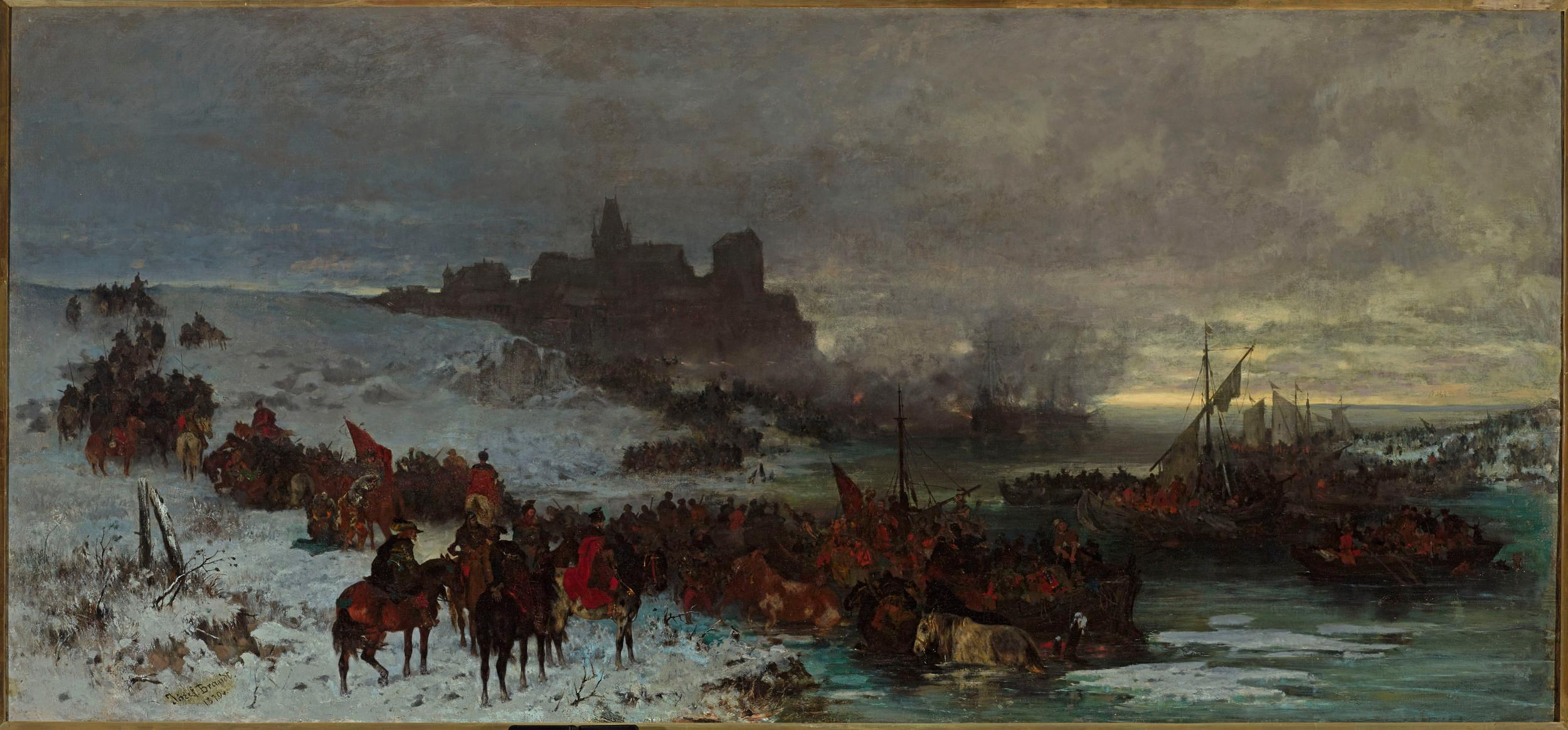
The troops of the Crown of the Kingdom of Poland, under the command of Stefan Czarniecki at Kolding in 1658.

When Christian IV became king in 1588 he choose to expand it further with the addition of the “Giant tower”, so named because of the four statues of giants from Greek and Roman mythology: (Hannibal, Hector, Scipio and Hercules) which adorned it. Today, the only statue on the tower is that of Hercules, since Hannibal and Hector were crushed during the 1808 fire and in a storm in 1854, Scipio fell to the ground.

On December 25, 1658, the troops of the Crown of the Kingdom of Poland, under the command of Stefan Czarniecki, after a naval landing, captured the fortress, liberating Kolding from the Swedish forces.

Over the course of time Copenhagen became the focal point of the political power and the outlying local royal residences were used less and less frequently. When Frederik IV became king he decided to remove most of the remaining surrounding walls leaving Koldinghus as it can be seen today.

== Fire ==
During the Napoleonic Wars in 1808, Denmark had allied herself with France and Spain against among others Sweden and England. It was decided that 30,000 French and Spanish soldiers were to be stationed in Denmark to assist in a campaign to recuperate the Scanian lands lost to Sweden 150 years earlier. The Spanish soldiers arrived during the winter of 1808 and were quartered at Koldinghus under the supervision of their French commander Jean-Baptiste Bernadotte (later to become king of Sweden and Norway). The Scandinavian climate typically being somewhat colder than that of Spain and France reportedly resulted in much activity around the furnaces and stoves to the extent of even furniture being set alight. This combined with the unusually large number of people concentrated in the castle may have been contributing factors to the fire which erupted in the early hours of a winter night. The fire was discovered all too late to salvage the main buildings.

== Restoration ==
The ongoing events in the Napoleonic Wars were not favourable to the kingdom and funds remained too tight to immediately warrant a reconstruction of the castle. It remained a ruin for several decades to come and over time became a popular landmark visited by among others HC Andersen. In the 1930'a, the large tower was reconstructed in bricks in order to save it from collapse.

It was eventually decided to save the castle via a comprehensive conservation effort focusing on the principles of conservational reversibility, meaning that the restoration can be rolled back without causing harm to the monument, and that all remains of the structure were afforded equal historic importance. The architects Inger and Johannes Exner conceived the project, which was carried out under the tenure of museum director Poul Dedenroth-Schou, active from 1976 to 2013. The restoration lasted from 1976 and finished in 1993. The restoration was awarded the Europa Nostra Award in 1993.

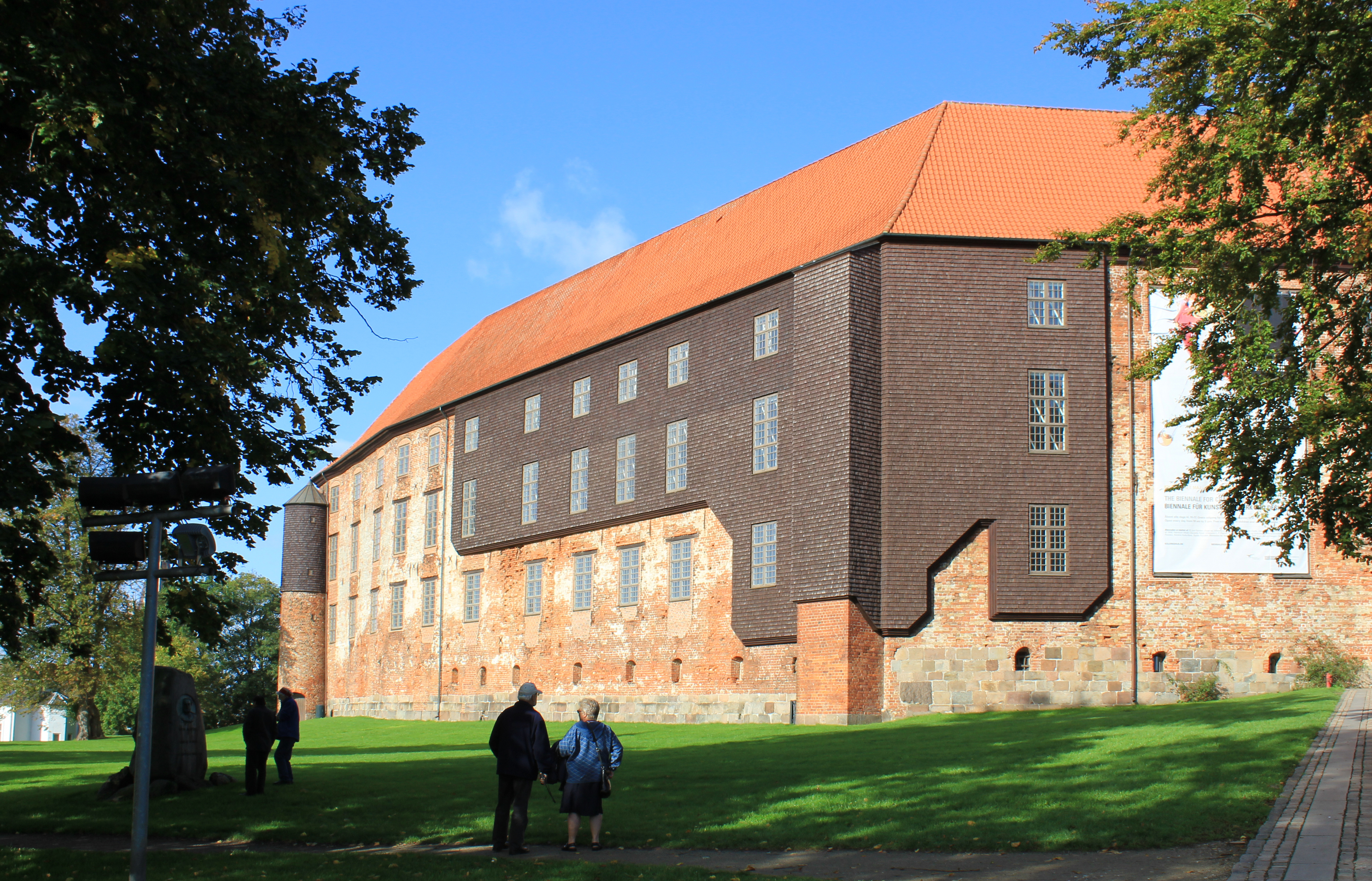
External restoration

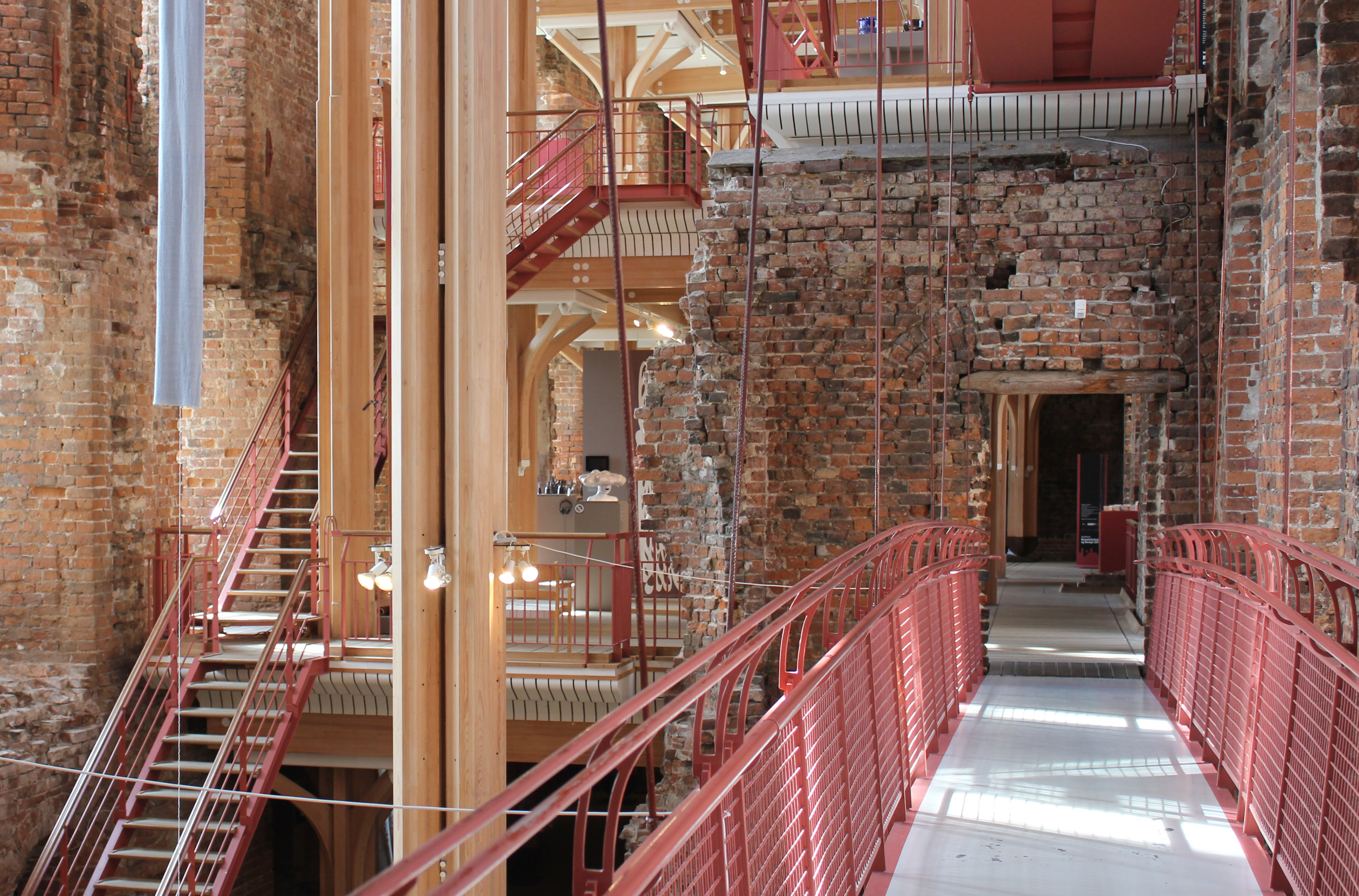
Internal restoration and outfitting

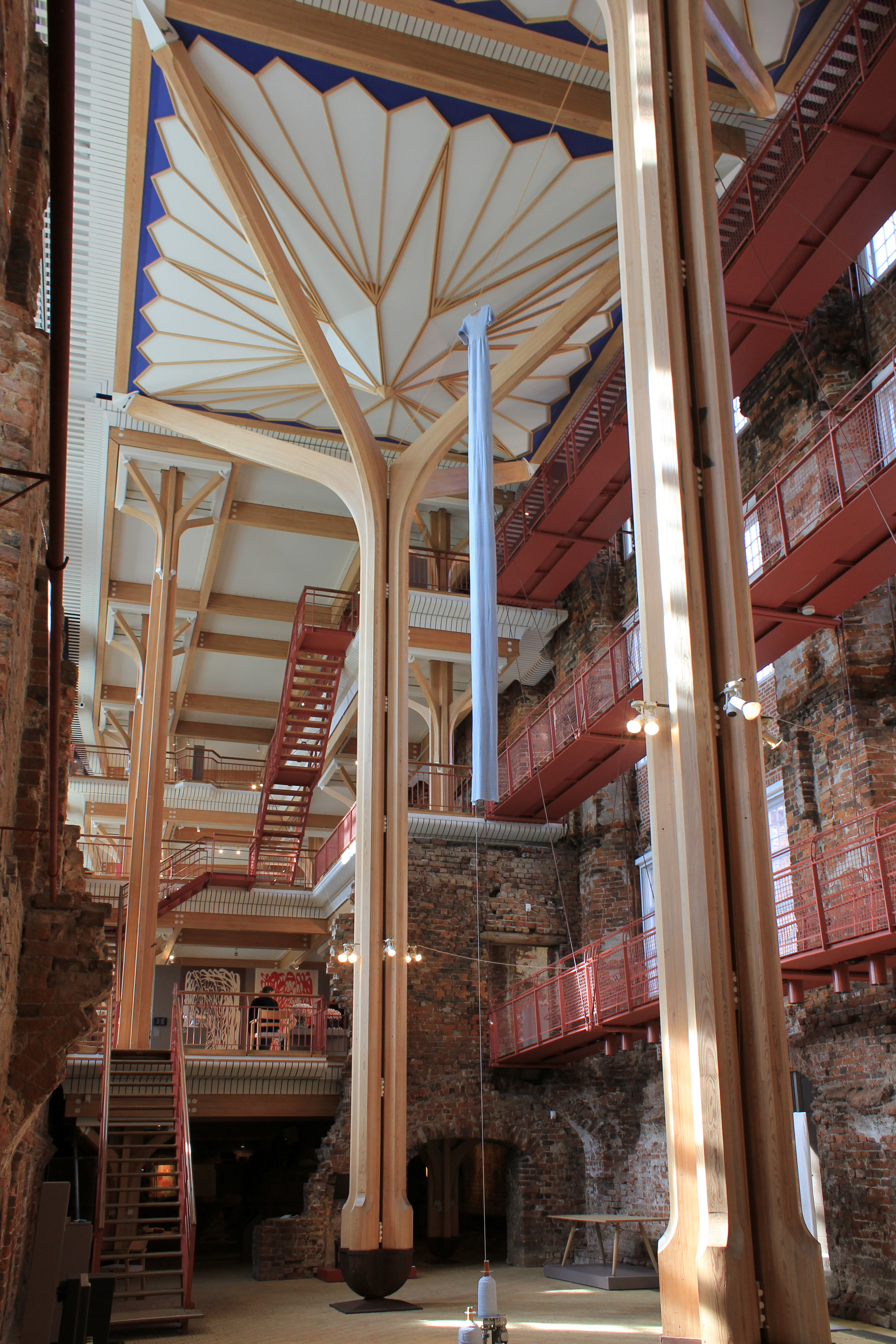
New supporting pillars in wood

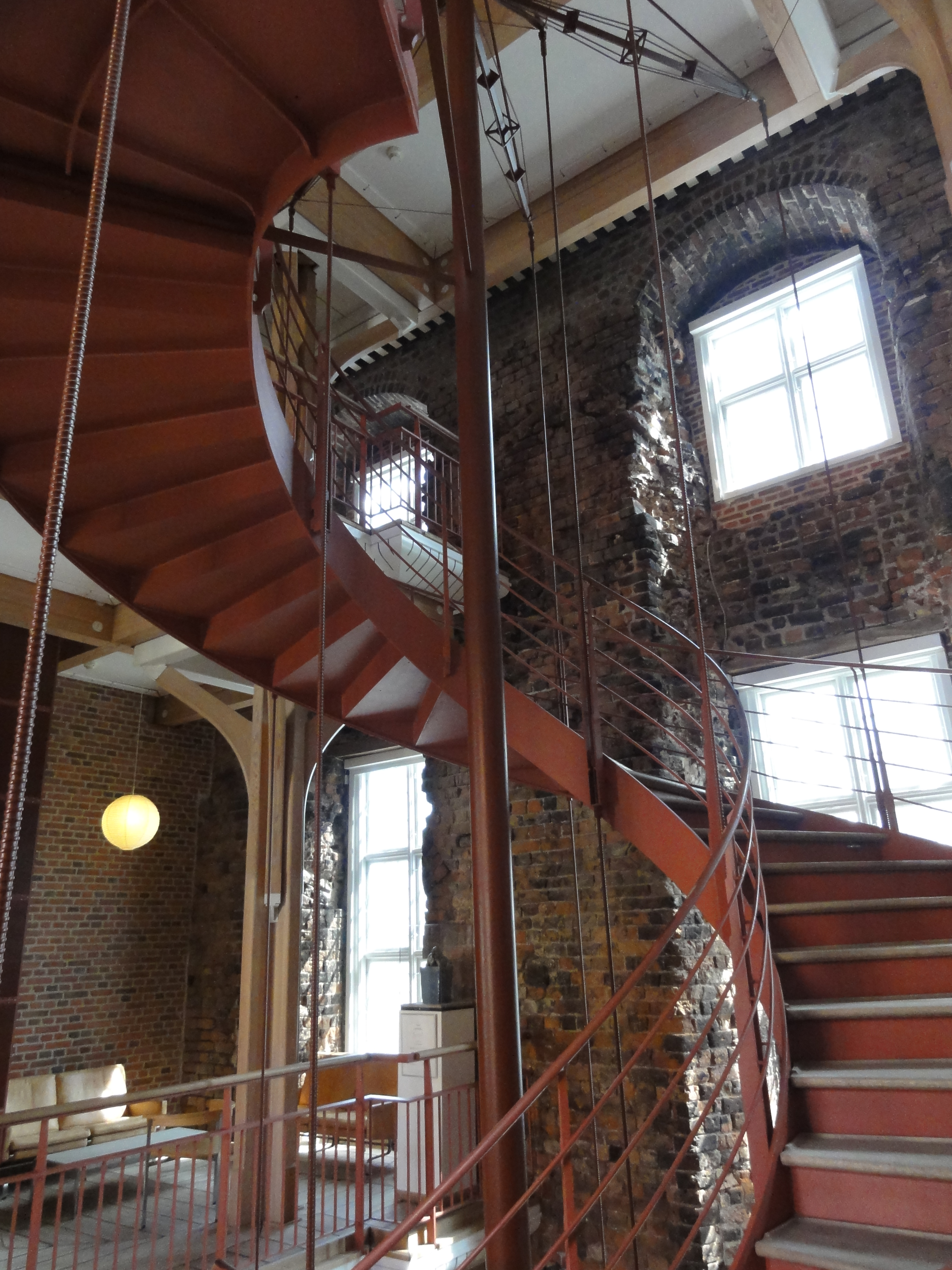
New staircases

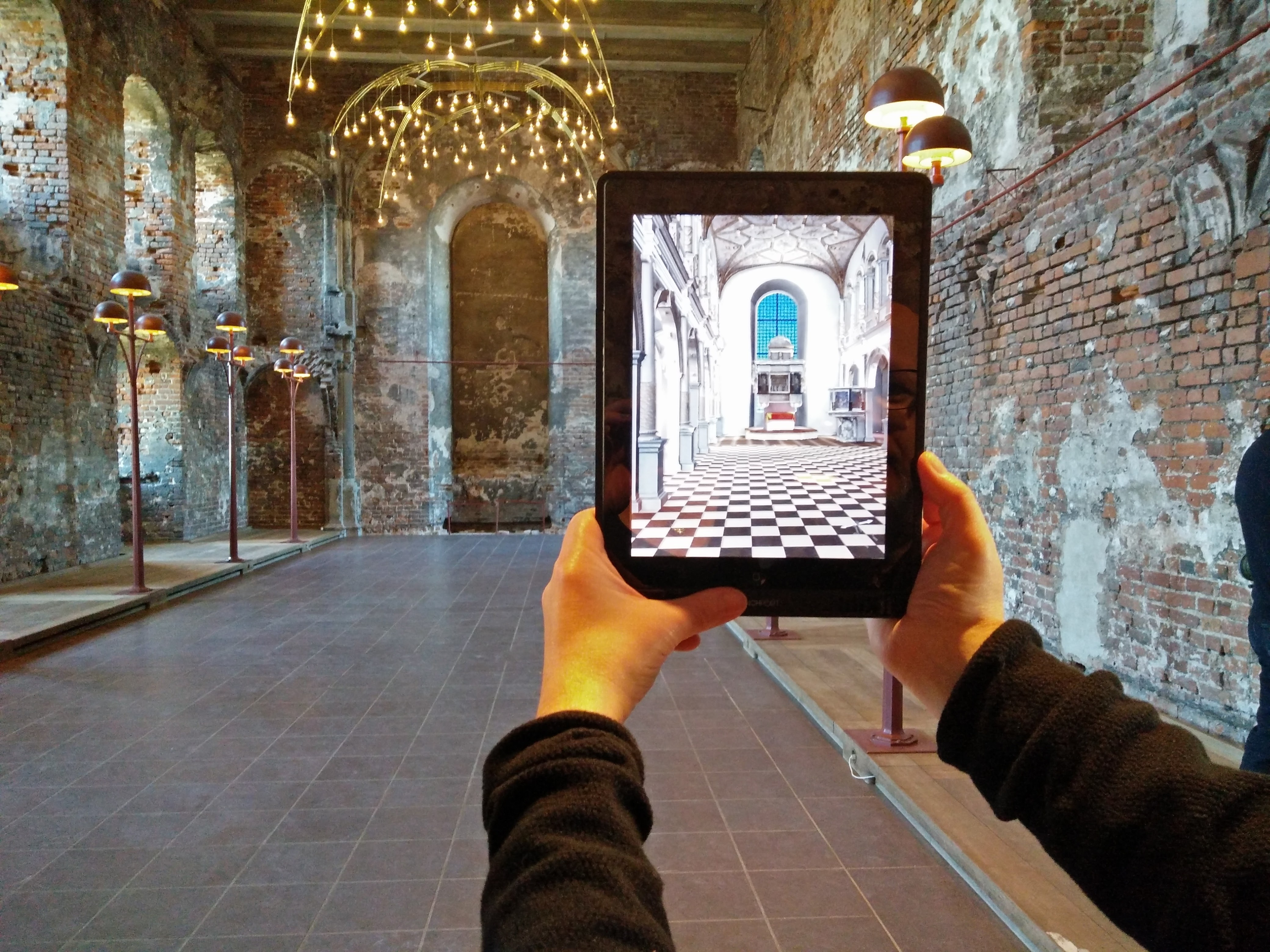
The castle church in augmented reality

== Exhibitions and events ==
In December 2009, the museum hosted the exhibition e-Collection, organized in collaboration with the Design School Kolding and the Trapholt Art Museum. The exhibition was held in connection with the United Nations Climate Change Conference and included innovative motorcycles, jewelry and other eco-friendly designs. The exhibition was opened by Crown Prince Frederik.

== Other sources ==
- Jensen, Vivi (1983), "Koldinghus. A Danish border castle of the late middle ages", Château Gaillard: Études de castellologie médiévale, vol. VIII, pp. 81–98, ISBN 9782902685011
- Lockhart, Paul Douglas (2004), Frederick II and the Protestant Cause: Denmark's Role in the Wars of Religion, 1559–1596, Koninklijke Brill, ISBN 9789004137905
- Ortmann, Jytte (1994) Slotte og Herregårde i Danmark (Sesam Egmont) ISBN 87-7801-392-5
