= Skjern River =

Coordinates: 55°55′N 8°23′E

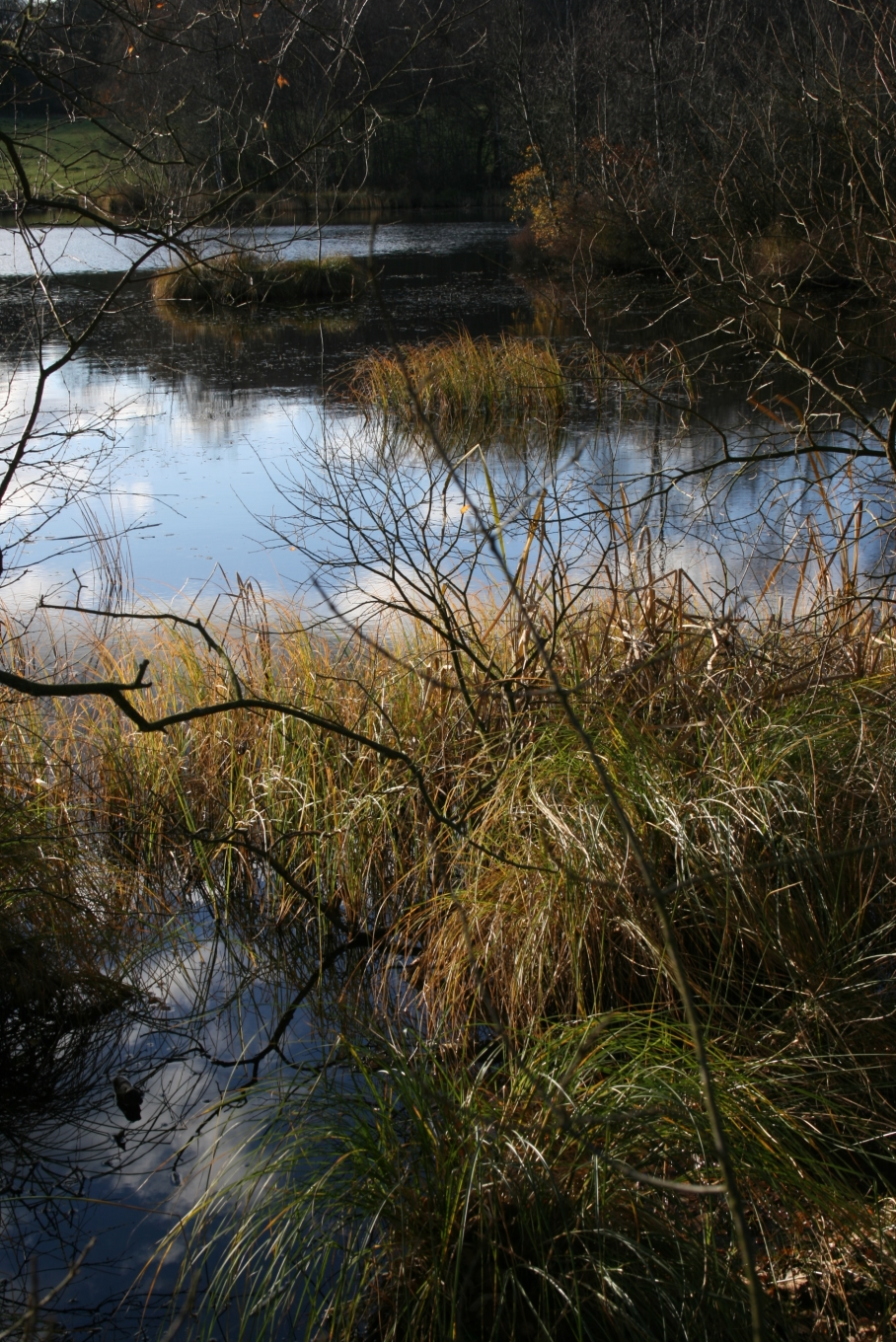
- The source of the Skjern River.
- Native name: Skjern Å (Danish)

Location
- Country: Denmark
- Region: Jutland
- District: Central Denmark Region

Physical characteristics
- Source: Tinnet Krat
  - elevation: 70 m (230 ft)
- Mouth: Ringkøbing Fjord
  - location: North Sea
  - elevation: 0 m (0 ft)
- Length: 94 km (58 mi)
- Basin size: 2,100 km^{2} (810 sq mi)
- Discharge
  - average: 35 m^{3}/s (1,200 cu ft/s)

Skjern River (Danish: Skjern Å) is the largest river in Denmark, in terms of volume. The river has its spring in Tinnet Krat in central Jutland, very close to Denmark's longest river, the Gudenå. It drains about one tenth of Denmark and flows into the Ringkøbing Fjord - a lagoon and former bay of the North Sea. The river has its name from the town of Skjern, located at the river delta (the only river delta in the country) at Ringkøbing Fjord. In flood stage, it can discharge up to 200 m³/s.

== Recent history ==
In the 1960s, the Danish government began straightening the rivers run and drain the extensive wetlands that had formed around the river mouth, to prevent the frequent floodings and allow for intensive farming in the region. However, the plan backfired. Without the frequent sediment deposits supplied by floodings, increasing amounts of chemical fertilizers and nutrients were needed to sustain a productive agriculture and the river, unable to spread the sediment across a wide wetland, silted up in many places. Furthermore, the land began to sink as it dried out and ceased to be replenished with fresh sediment. The slow sinking of the land made the drainage infrastructure increasingly ineffective.

By 1987, the government decided to implement a program of land rehabilitation to restore the river to a more natural state. Though the plan was not completed and approved until 1997, by 2002, the work was mostly completed. Much of the river and wetland are now protected area, home to a variety of wildlife, including otters, Atlantic salmon and a variety of waterbirds. Tourism and traditional cattle grazing, have replaced the intensive agriculture as the primary economic use of the land.

The restored Skjern River and surrounding delta was supposed to be incorporated in the Skjern Å National Park, comprising a 248.7-hectare (615-acre) area, but the national park project was abandoned in 2012. The national park process however, had already advanced to the level of establishing walking paths and facilities for visitors at that point and on 21 September 2014, two local citizens groups, involving nine towns and villages, unofficially opened Skjern Å National Park.

== See also ==
- List of rivers in Denmark
- List of national parks of Denmark

== Sources ==
- Ecological Engineering 2007 (Morten Lauge Pedersen et al.): Restoration of Skjern River and its valley—Short-term effects on river habitats, macrophytes and macroinvertebrates Department of Freshwater Ecology, National Environmental Research Institute.
