= Siege of Kolding (1368–1369) =

Siege in Denmark, 1369

Coordinates: 55°29′30″N 9°28′27″E

- Part of the Danish–Hanseatic War (1361–1370)
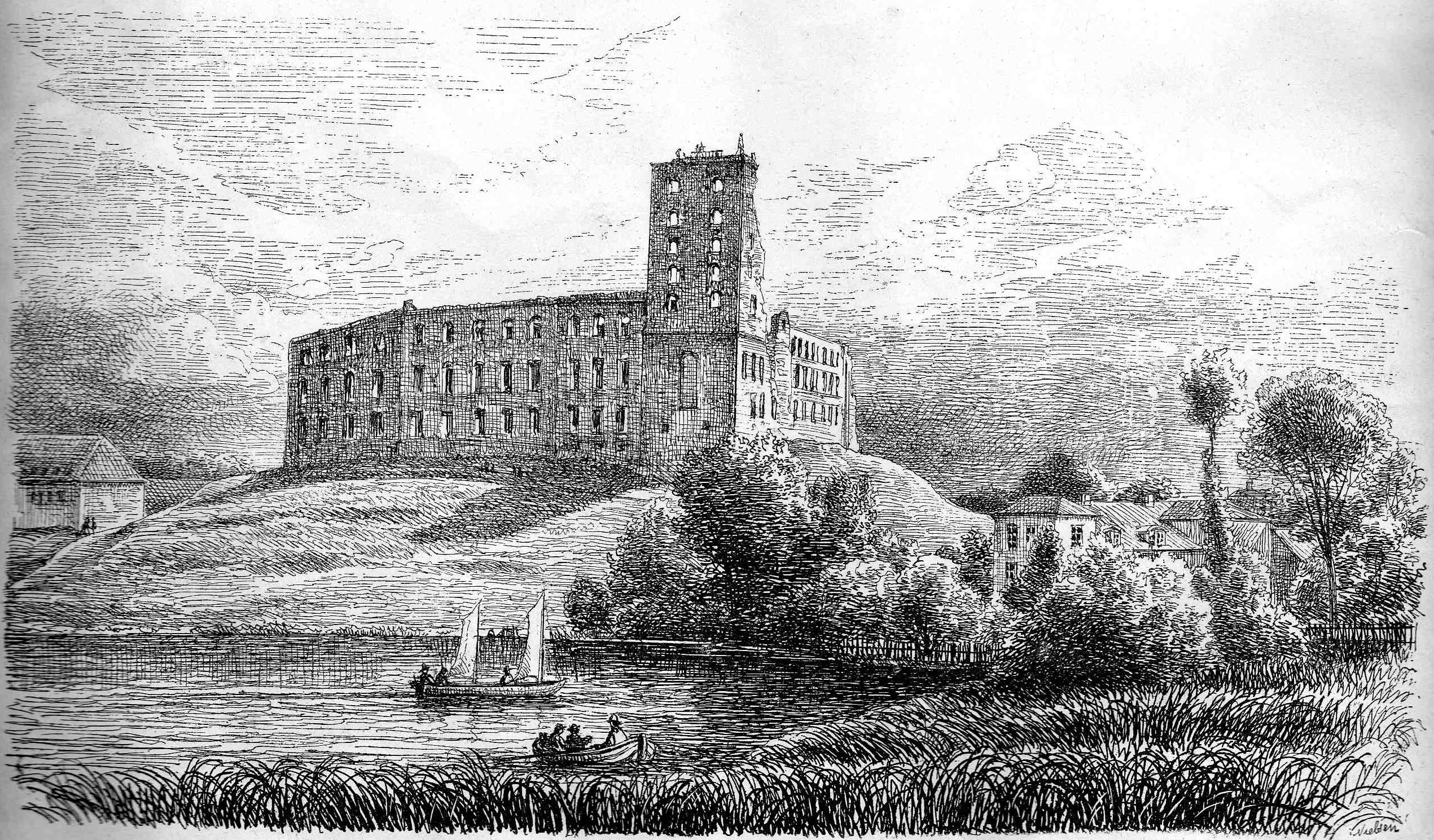
- Illustration of Koldinghus between 1865 and 1867, by Ferdinand Richardt
Date	1368 – 16 July 1369
Location	Kolding, Denmark
Result	Holsteinian–Jutish victory
Territorial changes	Status quo ante bellum

Belligerents
Holstein; Jutish noble rebels	Denmark

Commanders and leaders
Nicholas of Holstein; Henry II of Holstein; Jutish landlords	(Medieval Denmark) Peder Iversøn

Units involved
Unknown	(Medieval Denmark) Koldinghus garrison

Strength
Unknown	Unknown

Casualties and losses
Unknown	Unknown

The siege of Kolding (Danish: Belejringen af Kolding) also known as the siege of Koldinghus, was a siege by the County of Holstein on the Danish castle of Koldinghus in 1368 during the Danish–Hanseatic War (1361–1370). The siege would end inconclusive for both sides; however, the commander of the castle, Peder Iversøn, promised to surrender if King Valdemar IV of Denmark would die, abdicate, or lose the kingdom. Presumably, Iversøn surrendered at last, since he would not be mentioned in the later peace talks.

== Background ==
The Hanseatic League suffered a major military disaster at Helsingborg in 1362, leaving the Danish King, Valdemar, stronger than ever. In November 1367, 77 members of the Hanseatic diet in Cologne, decided to form an alliance-confederation to attack Denmark. The confederation was supported by Count Adolf of Holstein and Albert, King of Sweden. With the support of rebelling Jutish nobles, the Holsteinian army invaded Jutland, where the border fortifications of Ribe and Skodborg fell.

== Siege ==
The Castle of Koldinghus would also be besieged. The castle garrison would defend the city bravely, and the German dukes, Nicholas and Henry, would still be besieging the castle long into 1369. In July 1369 the siege still dragged on, and the dukes had likely tried to attack Høneborg and Hindsgavl castles, or at least threatened to do so. This resulted in negotiations with the commander of the castles, Peder IVersøn. The result of these negotiations looked similar to those concluded with Aalholm and Ravnsborg the year before. On 16 July, Iversøn sent a letter to the Holsteinian camps, in which he promised if King Valdemar should either lose the kingdom, voluntarily resign it, or die, he would hand over all his castles to the counts. However, if the king came to the kingdom again and demanded the castles back, Iversøn would hand them over to him.

== Aftermath ==
Presumably Koldinghus would fall to the besiegers, since no representatives of Koldinghus were present during the Treaty of Stralsund. Additionally, there is no other historic mentions of Peder Iversen ever again.

== See also ==
- Siege of Copenhagen (1368) – Siege and looting of Copenhagen by Hanseatic forces in 1368
- Treaty of Stralsund (1370) – 1370 peace treaty between Denmark and the Hanseatic League
- Siege of Helsingborg (1368–1369) – Siege in Helsingborg between Swedish, Hanseatic and Danish forces
- Siege of Kolding (1341) – 1341 siege in Denmark

== Works cited ==
- Reisnert, Anders (2015). The Siege and Storm of Lindholmen during the Second Hanseatic War (1368-1369) (PDF). Sweden: DR. RUDOLF HABELT GMBH • BONN.
- Reinhardt, Christian (1880). Valdemar Atterdag og hans Kongegjerning (in Danish). Gad.
- Barfod, Povl Frederik (1885). Danmarks historie fra 1319 til 1536 (in Danish). K. Schönberg.
