= Gudenå =

Gudenå The Guden River, Gudenåen
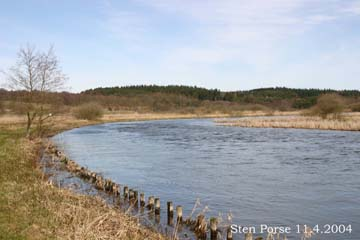
- A northward view of the River Guden close to Lake Sminge

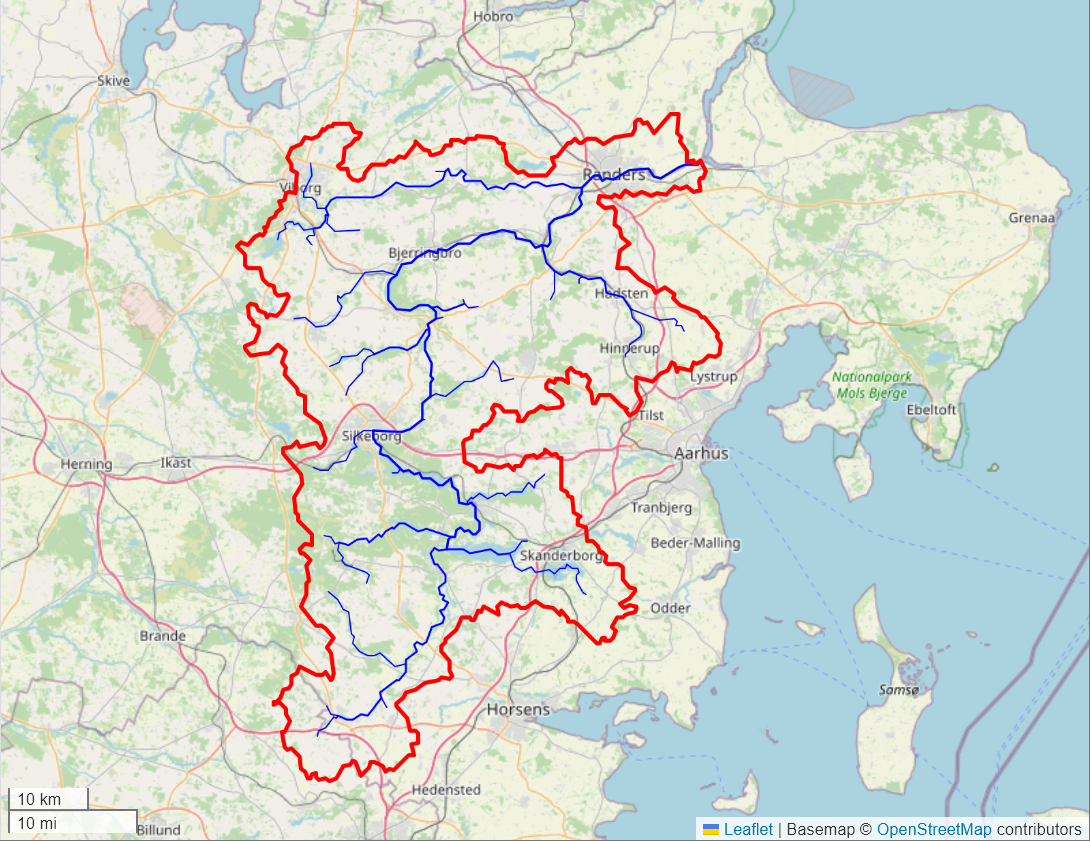
- Map of the Gudenå watershed, upstream of Grund Fjord and Randers Fjord
- Etymology: Gudars stream, Gods stream

Location
- Country: Denmark
- Regions: Southern Denmark, Central Denmark
- Municipalities: Vejle, Hedensted, Horsens, Skanderborg, Silkeborg, Viborg, Favrskov, Randers, Norddjurs (Randers Fjord only)

Physical characteristics
- Source: Source of the Gudenå (Gudenåens udspring)
  - location: Tinnet Krat, Vejle Municipality
  - coordinates: 55°54′7″N 9°24′3″E
- Mouth: Randers Fjord
  - location: Randers Municipality, Norddjurs Municipality
  - coordinates: 56°29′N 10°13′E
  - elevation: 0 m (0 ft)
- Length: 149 km (93 mi) (river); 149 km (inc. Randers Fjord)
- Basin size: 3,300 km^{2} (1,300 sq mi)
- Discharge
  - average: 32.4 m^{3}/s (1,140 cu ft/s)
- Denmark's largest river measured by water volume, the Skjern River, also emerges in Tinnet Krat, close to the source of Gudenå.

The Gudenå or Gudenåen (pronounced [ˈkuˀðn̩ˌɔˀn̩]) is a river in eastern Jutland, Denmark. It is the longest river in Denmark, though Skjern River is larger by discharge. An anglicized version of the name often seen is 'The River Guden'.

The Gudenå has its spring in Tinnet Krat, Vejle Municipality (between Nørre Snede and Tørring-Uldum) and flows a total of 149 kilometres (93 mi) to Randers Fjord in Randers, on a northward course which takes it through the central parts of Jutland. On its way, the river traverses the relatively high lying region of Søhøjlandet, through the lakes of Naldal Sø, Vestbirk Sø, Mossø, Gudensø, Rye Mølle Sø, Birksø, Julsø, Borre Sø, Brassø, Silkeborg Langsø and Sminge Sø before it empties in Randers Fjord; a long inlet of the Kattegat sea. It is fed by numerous streams and wetlands along the way.

The Gudenå came into existence some 15,000 years ago, at the end of the last Ice Age, when melting ice and glacial streams carved out its bed. The river shelters many species of animals and parts of its course are to be protected under the regulations of Natura 2000.

== Local government ==
The drainage basin of Randers Fjord falls within the boundaries of 13 Danish municipalities. Voluntary collaboration on the use and protection of the Gudenå between the municipalities is organized through the Gudenå Committee (Gudenåkomitéen), as well as GudenåSamarbejdet.

== See also ==
- List of rivers of Denmark
