= Margaret I of Denmark =

Scandinavian queen and founder of the Kalmar Union (1353–1412)

Margaret I
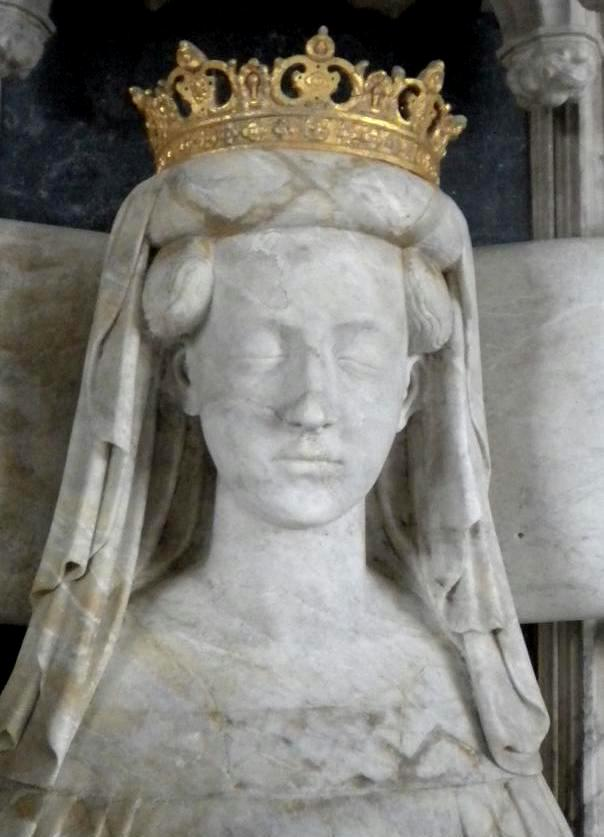
- 1423 effigy on Margaret's tomb in Roskilde Cathedral, Denmark

Queen of Denmark
- Reign: 10 August 1387 – 28 October 1412 (also regent for her co-sovereign Erik)
- Predecessor: Olaf II
- Successor: Erik of Pomerania (as sole sovereign)
- Co-sovereign: Erik of Pomerania (from 1396)

Queen of Norway
- Reign: 2 February 1388 – 28 October 1412 (also regent for her co-sovereign Erik)
- Predecessor: Olaf IV
- Successor: Erik of Pomerania (as sole sovereign)
- Co-sovereign: Erik of Pomerania (from 1389)

Queen of Sweden
- Reign: 24 February 1389 – 28 October 1412 (also regent for her co-sovereign Erik)
- Predecessor: Albert
- Successor: Erik of Pomerania (as sole sovereign)
- Co-sovereign: Erik of Pomerania (from 1396)

Regent of Denmark
- Regency: 3 May 1376 – 3 August 1387
- Monarch: Olaf II

Queen consort of Norway
- Tenure: 9 April 1363 – 11 September 1380

Queen consort of Sweden
- Tenure: 9 April 1363 – 15 February 1364
- Born: March 1353; Søborg Castle, Denmark
- Died: 28 October 1412 (aged 59); Ship in the harbor of Flensburg, Schleswig, Denmark
- Burial: Roskilde Cathedral, Zealand, Denmark
- Spouse: Haakon VI of Norway (m. 1363; died 1380)
- Issue: Olaf II of Denmark
- House: Estridsen
- Father: Valdemar IV of Denmark
- Mother: Helvig of Schleswig

Margaret I (Danish: Margrete Valdemarsdatter; March 1353 – 28 October 1412) was queen regnant of Denmark, Norway, and Sweden from the late 1380s until her death, and the founder of the Kalmar Union that joined the Scandinavian kingdoms together for over a century. She had been queen consort of Norway from 1363 to 1380 and of Sweden from 1363 to 1364 by marriage to Haakon VI. Margaret was known as a wise, energetic and capable leader, who governed with "farsighted tact and caution", earning the nickname "Semiramis of the North". Also known famously and derisively as "King Breechless", one of several derogatory nicknames once thought to have been invented by her rival Albert, King of Sweden, she was also called "Lady King" by her subjects, widely used in recognition of her capabilities. Knut Gjerset calls her "the first great ruling queen in history".

The youngest daughter of Valdemar IV of Denmark, Margaret was born at Søborg Castle. She was a practical, patient administrator and diplomat, albeit one of high aspirations and a strong will, who intended to unite Scandinavia forever into one single entity with the strength to resist and compete against the might of the Hanseatic League. In 1363, aged ten, Margaret married Haakon VI. In 1370, they had a son, Olaf. Following the deaths of her husband and son, Margaret was proclaimed queen of the Scandinavian kingdoms. She was ultimately succeeded by a grandnephew, Erik of Pomerania. Although Erik came of age in 1401, Margaret continued for the remaining 11 years of her life to be sole ruler in all but name. Her regency marked the beginning of a Dano-Norwegian union which was to last for more than four centuries.

Some Norwegian and Swedish historians have criticized Margaret for favouring Denmark and being too autocratic, although she is generally thought to have been highly regarded in Norway and respected in Denmark and Sweden. She was painted in a negative light in contemporary religious chronicles, as she had no qualms suppressing the Church to promote royal power. Margaret is known in Denmark as Margrethe I to distinguish her from Margrethe II.

== Early years and marriage ==
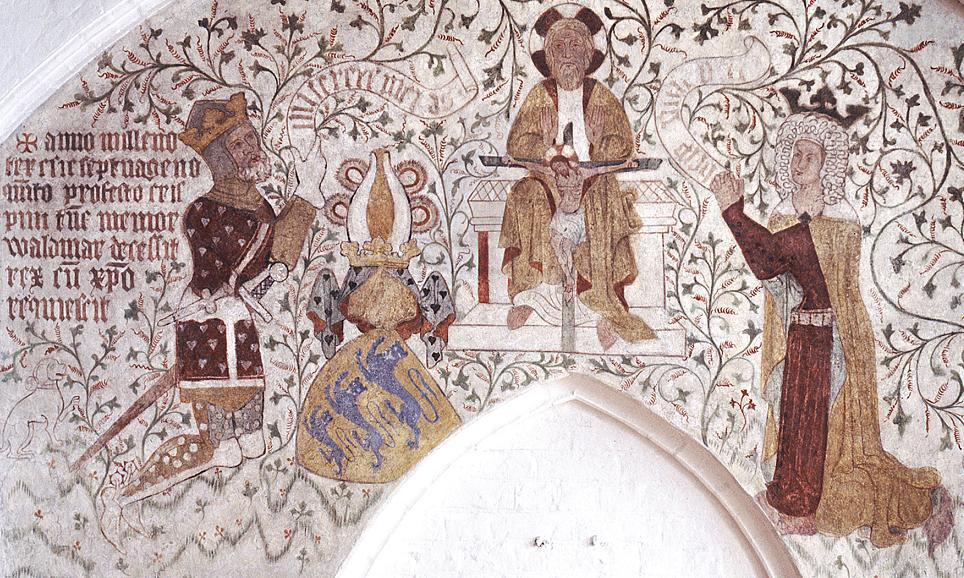
Margaret's parents, King Valdemar IV (left) and Queen Helvig (right), c. 1375.

Margaret was born in March 1353 as the sixth and youngest child of King Valdemar IV and Queen Helvig of Denmark. She was born in the prison of Søborg Castle, where her father had already confined her mother. She was baptised in Roskilde and in 1359, at the age of six, engaged to the 18-year-old King Haakon VI, the youngest son of the Swedish-Norwegian king Magnus IV & VII. As part of the marriage contract, it is presumed that a treaty was signed ensuring Magnus the assistance of King Valdemar in a dispute with his second son, Erik "XII" of Sweden, who in 1356 held dominion over Southern Sweden. Margaret's marriage was thus a part of the Nordic power struggle. There was dissatisfaction with this in some circles, and the political activist Bridget of Sweden described the agreement in a letter to the Pope as "children playing with dolls". The goal of the marriage for King Valdemar was regaining Scania, which since 1332 had been mortgaged to Sweden. Per contemporary sources, the marriage contract contained an agreement to give Helsingborg Castle back to Denmark, but that was not enough for Valdemar, who in June 1359 took a large army across Øresund and soon occupied Scania. The attack was ostensibly to support Magnus against Erik, but in June 1359, Erik died. As a result, the balance of power changed, and all agreements between Magnus and Valdemar were terminated, including the marriage contract between Margaret and Haakon.

This did not result in the withdrawal of Valdemar from Scania; he instead continued his conquests on the island of Gotland in the Baltic Sea. Visby, which was populated by Germans, was the main town on the island and was the key to domination of the Baltic Sea. On 27 July 1361 a battle was fought between a well-equipped Danish army and an array of local Gotland peasants. The Danes won the battle and took Visby, while the Germans did not take part. King Magnus and the Hanseatic League could not disregard this provocation, and a trade embargo against Denmark was immediately enacted, with agreement about necessary military action. At the same time, negotiations opened between King Magnus and Henry of Holstein about a marriage between Haakon and the latter's sister Elizabeth. On 17 December 1362, a ship left with Elizabeth bound for Sweden. A storm, however, diverted her to the Danish island Bornholm, where the archbishop of Lund declared the wedding a violation of church law because Haakon had already been engaged to Margaret. The Swedish and Hanseatic armies also ultimately withdrew from their siege of Helsingborg. Following this, a truce was concluded. The Hanseatic States and King Magnus abandoned the war, and the previous engagement of the now 10-year-old Margaret and King Haakon became relevant again. The wedding was held in Copenhagen on 9 April 1363.

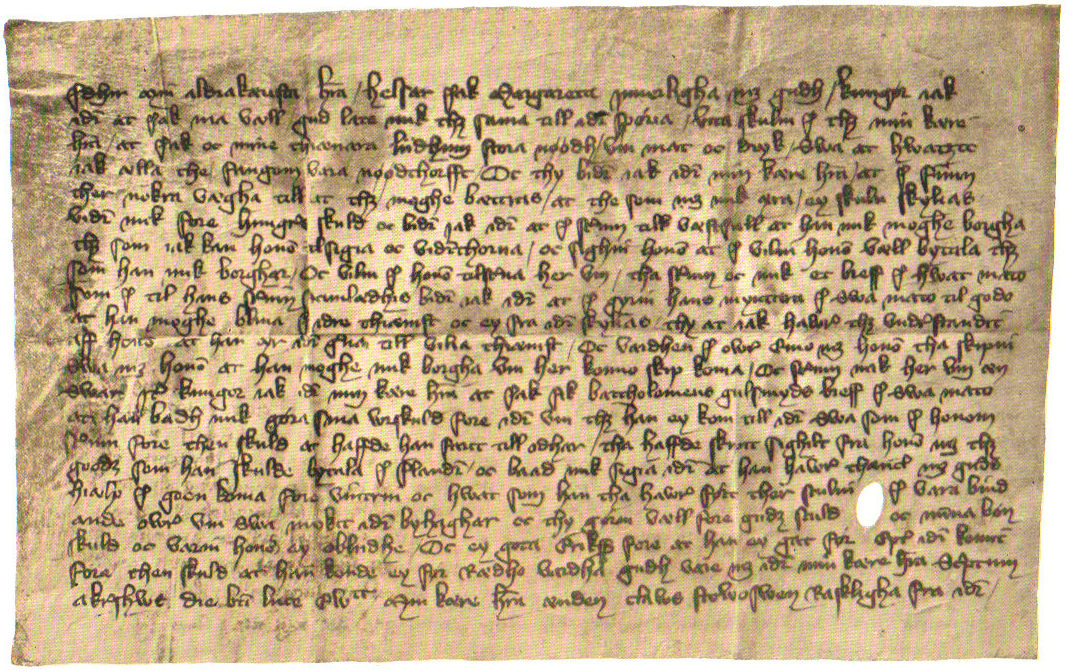
A page from a letter in which Margaret informs her husband King Haakon VI of her and her servants' distress at Akershus Fortress, asking him to provide sustenance and conveying various news. Dated 18 October, c. 1370.

The marriage of Haakon and Margaret was an alliance, and Margaret likely remained in Denmark for some time after the wedding, but ultimately was taken to Akershus in Oslo Fjord where she was raised by Merete Ulvsdatter. Merete Ulvsdatter was a distinguished noblewoman and daughter of Bridget of Sweden, as well as the wife of Knut Algotsson, who was one of King Magnus's faithful followers. Margaret was brought up with Merete's daughter Ingegerd, who likely instructed her in matters of religion and monarchy. Merete's daughters, Ingegerd and Catherine, became her closest female friends, with Margaret later showing favoritism to Ingegerd, who became an abbess, as well as her monastery. It is also likely, though, that her promotion of the Bridgettines was also out of piety and political interest to help the process of integration. Her academic studies were probably limited, but it is assumed that in addition to reading and writing she also was instructed in statecraft. She displayed an early talent for ruling and appears to have held real power.

In the years after Margaret's wedding Scandinavia saw a series of major political upheavals. A few months after her wedding, her only brother, Christopher, Duke of Lolland, died, leaving her father without an obvious male heir. In 1364 the Swedish nobles deposed Margaret's husband and father-in-law from the Swedish throne and elected Albert of Mecklenburg as king of Sweden.

== Regency ==
Her first act after her father's death in 1375 was to procure the election of her infant son Olaf as king of Denmark, despite the claims of her elder sister Ingeborg's husband Henry III, Duke of Mecklenburg, and their son Albert. Margaret insisted that Olaf be proclaimed rightful heir of Sweden, among his other titles. He was too young to rule in his own right, and Margaret proved herself a competent and shrewd ruler in the years that followed. On the death of Haakon in 1380, Olaf succeeded him as King of Norway. Olaf died suddenly in 1387, aged 16, and Margaret, who had ruled both kingdoms in his name, was chosen Regent of Norway and Denmark in the following year. She had already proven her keen statesmanship by recovering possession of Schleswig from the Holstein-Rendsburg Counts. The Counts had held it for more than a generation and received it back as a fief by the Compact of Nyborg in 1386, but under such stringent conditions that the Danish Crown received all the advantages of the arrangement. By this compact, the often rebellious Jutish nobility lost the support they had previously enjoyed in Schleswig and Holstein. Margaret, free from fear of domestic sedition, could now give her undivided attention to Sweden, where mutinous nobles, led by Birger (son of Bridget and brother of Martha), were already in arms against their unpopular King Albert. Several of the powerful nobles wrote to Margaret that if she would help rid Sweden of Albert, she would become their regent. She quickly gathered an army and invaded Sweden.

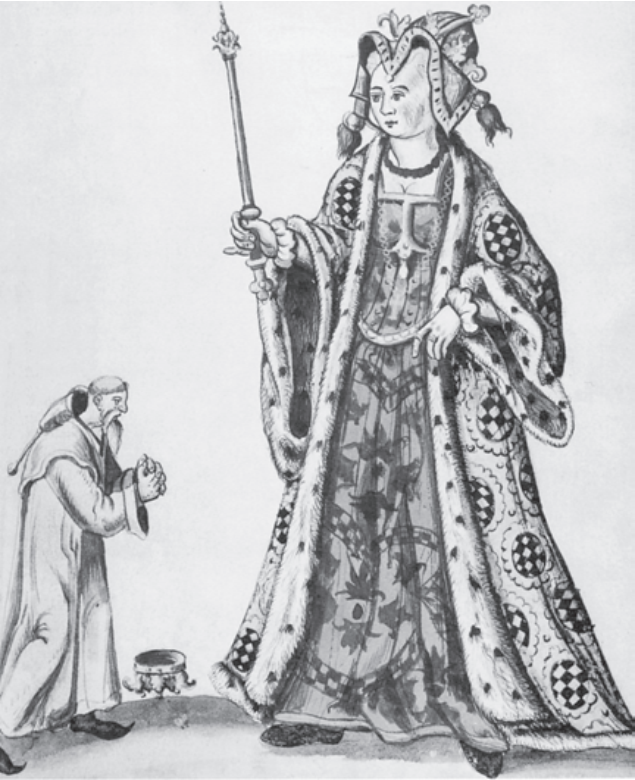
King Albert begs Queen Margaret for mercy, as imagined in 1589. The Royal Library, Denmark.

At a conference held at Dalaborg Castle in March 1388, the Swedes were compelled to accept all of Margaret's conditions, elected her "Sovereign Lady and Ruler", and committed themselves to accept any king she chose to appoint. Albert, who had called her "King Pantsless" returned from Mecklenburg with an army of mercenaries. On 24 February 1389, the decisive battle took place at either Aasle or Falan near Falköping. General Henrik Parow, the Mecklenburger commander of Margaret's forces, was killed in battle, but he managed to win it for her. Margaret was now the omnipotent mistress of three kingdoms.

Stockholm, then almost entirely a German city, still held out. Fear of Margaret induced both the Mecklenburg princes and the Wendish towns to hasten to its assistance; and the Baltic and the North Sea speedily swarmed with the privateers of the Victual Brothers. The Hanseatic League intervened, and under the Compact of Lindholm (1395), Margaret released Albert on his promise to pay 60,000 marks within three years. Meanwhile, the Hansa were to hold Stockholm as surety. Albert failed to pay his ransom within the stipulated time, and the Hansa surrendered Stockholm to Margaret in September 1398 in exchange for commercial privileges.

=== Erik of Pomerania ===
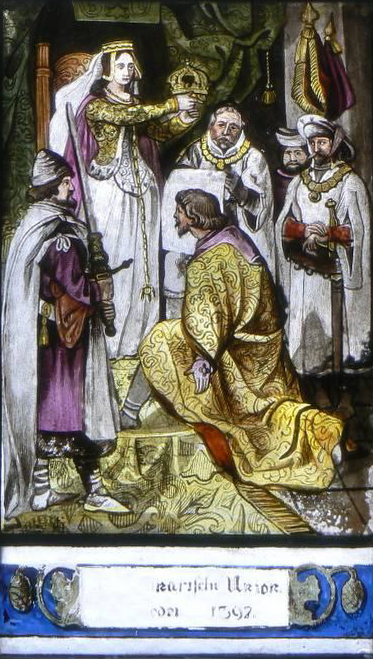
An allegory of the inception of the Kalmar Union: Queen Margaret crowning Erik of Pomerania king of Norway, as depicted in a stained-glass window at Pena Palace, Portugal.

It had been understood that Margaret should, at the first convenient opportunity, provide the three kingdoms with a king who was to be a kinsman of all the three old dynasties, although in Norway it was specified that she would continue ruling alongside the new king, while in Sweden, the nobles assured Margaret that they were content to do without a king throughout her lifetime, which they hoped would be long. In 1389 she proclaimed her great-nephew, Bogislav, who changed his name to Erik of Pomerania (grandson of Henry of Mecklenburg), king of Norway, having adopted him and his sister Catherine. In 1396, homage was rendered to him in Denmark and Sweden, while Margaret once again assumed the regency during his minority.

=== Union of Kalmar ===
On 20 July, Margaret capitalized on the general rejoicing by publishing the famous Treaty of Kalmar, "a masterly document that sealed the union of Norway, Sweden and Denmark". The date she chose was no coincidence – it was the Feast Day of St. Margaret of Antioch, who like the Lady King herself, was cast off by her father and thrown into prison. The treaty proposed "everlasting union", which reflected her dearest ambition, that "all three realms should exist together in harmony and love, and whatever befalleth one, war and rumors of war, or the onslaught of foreigners, that shall be for all three, and each kingdom shall help the others in all fealty ...and hereafter the Nordic realms shall have one king, and not several."

Well aware of regional pride and prejudice, Margaret played a careful strategy, assuring her subjects that each state would be governed according to the laws and customs of each, no new laws would be introduced without the consent of the subjects, officials from governors to soldiers would be recruited from the native populations, thus showing her subjects that they would enjoy every benefit of union without any threat to national identity. To weld the united kingdoms still more closely together, Margaret summoned a congress of the three Councils of the Realm to Kalmar in June 1397, and on Trinity Sunday, 17 June, Erik was crowned king of Denmark, Norway and Sweden. The Act of Union resulting from this was never completed. Scholars continue to debate the reasons, but the Union existed de facto through the early 16th century reign of King Christian II, and the union of Denmark and Norway continued until 1814.

A few years after the Kalmar Union, the 18-year-old Erik was declared of age and homage was rendered to him in all his three kingdoms, although Margaret was the effective ruler of Scandinavia throughout her lifetime.

=== Kalmar Union and royal policy ===
The geographical extent of the Kalmar Union in c. 1400

So long as the union was insecure, Margaret had tolerated the presence of the Riksråd, but their influence was minor and the Royal authority remained supreme. The offices of High Constable and Earl Marshal were left vacant; the Danehof fell into ruin, and "the great Queen, an ideal despot", ruled through her court officials, who served as a superior kind of clerk. In any event, law and order were well maintained and the licence of the nobility was sternly repressed. The kingdoms of Sweden and Norway were treated as integral parts of the Danish State, and national aspirations were frowned upon or checked, though Norway, being more loyal, was treated more indulgently than Sweden.

In 1396, according to Grethe Jacobsen, she issued an ordinance that one should to a higher degree than hitherto respect and enforce peace towards church (pax dei), houses, farms, legal assemblies, workers in the fields – and women, expressed in the word "kvindefred". Jacobsen believes that as punishment for rape was normally not associated with the other forms for upholding peace in the tradition of pax dei, this may be an expression of Margrete's perception of women as being particularly vulnerable in times of unrest, and for her own interpretation of the ruler as protector of personae miserabiles, which included maidens and widows. Another testament was her dispositions of 1411 through which she distributed the sum of 500 marcs among the women who had been 'violated and debased' during the wars between Sweden and Denmark 1388–1389.

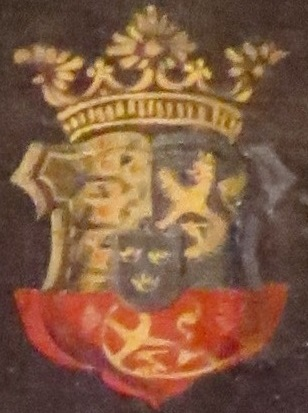
Margaret's Royal Arms combined the arms of the three kingdoms, according to the Nationalmuseum.

Margaret recovered for the Crown all the landed property that had been alienated in the troubled times before the reign of Valdemar IV. This so-called reduktion, or land-recovery, was carried out with the utmost rigour, and hundreds of estates fell into the hands of the crown. She also reformed the Danish currency, substituting good silver coins for the old and worthless copper tokens, to the great advantage both of herself and of the state. She always had large sums of money at her disposal, and much of it was given to charity.

According to Thomas Kingston Derry, Margaret tried to provide the union with a sound economic basis. In the process, each of her measures (recovery of crown lands from nobility and the church, new taxes and new coins) hurt the interests of powerful classes, but she prevented them from having leadership by making little use of separate councils of her three kingdoms, relying on a body of civil and ecclesiastical officials she chose with great skills instead. She placed Danes in Swedish and Norwegian bishoprics, while royal estates and castles were managed by castellans and bailiffs of foreign extraction. While this has been criticized as promoting Danes at the expense of Swedish and Norwegian people, Derry opines that considering she employed more Germans in her native Denmark than elsewhere, she was mainly interested in securing a loyal and efficient administration.

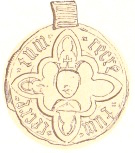
Seal of Margaret, in known use 1381–1409.

She travelled much, in her later years is said to have spent more time in Sweden than in Denmark. She encouraged intermarriages among the nobility of three realms. Her piety is well-known, and she gave strong backing to the canonisation of St.Brigitta, helped to make Vadstena into a strong cultural centre and encouraged the spread of "Brigittine language", which led to many Swedish expressions coming into use among Danes and Norwegians.

In contrast with the foreign policy of her venturesome father, Margaret's was circumspect and unswervingly neutral in the bloody war between France and England as well as other European conflicts. However, she spared no pains to recover lost Danish territory. She purchased the island of Gotland from its actual possessors, Albert of Mecklenburg and the Livonian Order, and the greater part of Schleswig was regained in the same way.

In 1402 Margaret entered into negotiations with King Henry IV of England about the possibility of a double-wedding alliance between England and the Nordic Union. The proposal was for King Erik to marry Henry's daughter Philippa, and for Henry's son, the Prince of Wales and future Henry V of England, to marry Erik's sister Catherine. According to Marc Shell, Margaret's vision was that one day, two unions would unite to recreate Cnut the Great's Empire of the North. The English side wanted these weddings to seal an offensive alliance that could have led the Nordic kingdoms to become involved in the Hundred Years' War against France. Margaret followed a consistent policy of not becoming involved in binding alliances and foreign wars, and therefore rejected the English proposals. However, although there was no double wedding, Erik married the 13-year-old Philippa, daughter of Henry IV of England and Mary de Bohun, at Lund on 26 October 1406, sealing a purely defensive alliance. For Erik's sister Catherine, a wedding was arranged with John, Count Palatine of Neumarkt. Margaret thus acquired a South German ally, who could be useful as a counterweight to the North German Princes and cities.

== Death ==
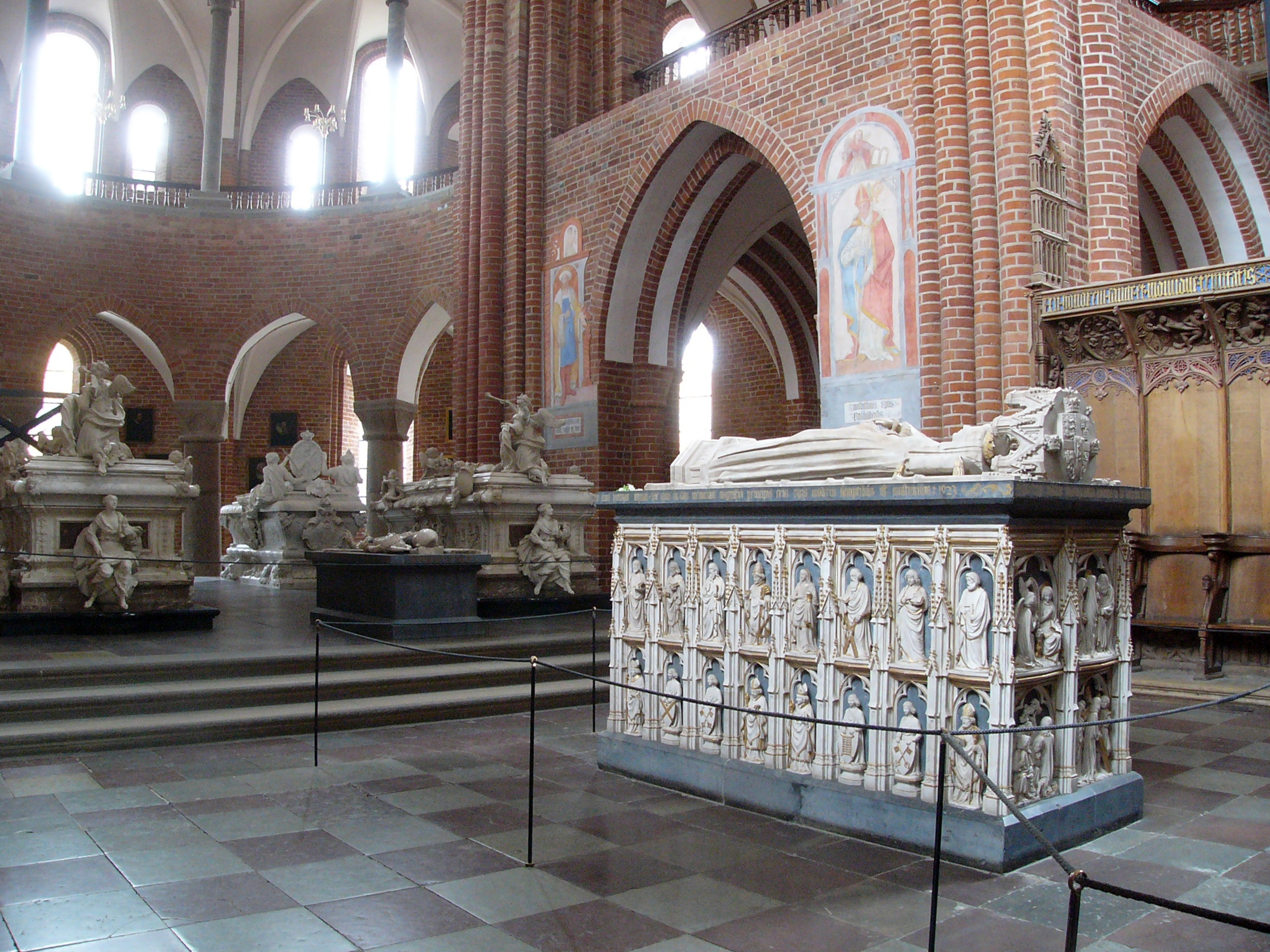
Margaret's elaborate tomb, near subsequent royal sarcophagi in Roskilde Cathedral, Denmark.

In 1412, Margaret tried to recover Schleswig, and thus entered a war with Holstein. Before that she had managed the recovery of Gotland. While winning the war, Margaret died suddenly on board her ship in Flensburg Harbour.

In October 1412, she set sail from Seeland in her ship. She attended several debates, which reportedly had brought matters to a state of promising forwardness. On retiring to her vessel though, with the intention of leaving the port, "she was seized with sudden and violent illness". Margaret apparently foresaw the end of her life, as she ordered thirty seven marks to be paid to the nearby monastery of Campen for a perpetual mass for her soul. Beyond this, there is no discussion in the historical record regarding her demise. She died on the night of 28 October 1412, the vigil of St. Simon and St. Jude. Possible scenarios that have been suggested include plague, shock from the death of Abraham Brodersson (whom 18th-century authors have alleged was the father of a daughter Margareta had, while 19th-century authors have blamed the story on a mistranslation), or poisoning by Erik.

Her sarcophagus, made by the Lübeck sculptor Johannes Junge in 1423, is situated behind the high altar in Roskilde Cathedral, near Copenhagen. She had left property to the cathedral on the condition that Masses for her soul would be said regularly in the future. This was discontinued in 1536 during the Protestant Reformation, though a special bell is still rung twice daily in commemoration.

== Appearance and personality ==
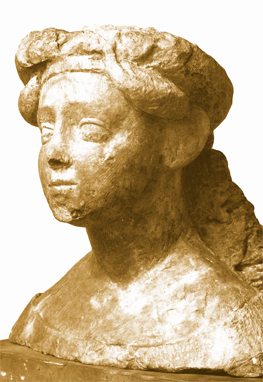
Bust of Margaret from her own time.

She has been described as a beautiful woman with dark hair, dark eyes, an intimidating gaze and the aura of absolute authority. She was highly energetic well into her old age, autocratic and indomitable, at the same time also described as wise, just, tactful, and kind. Hudson Strode writes "Margaret, who, like St. Bridget, possessed the masculine quality of indomitability, was undoubtedly the strongest. No male public official ever worked harder at his job. She used her constructive ability, her diplomacy, and her force of will to make the Union a success and to maintain the royal prerogative."

== Ambiguities concerning titles ==
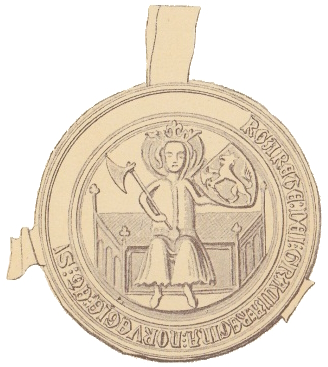
Margaret's Norwegian seal, from a document dated 6 March 1388, Akershus. The inscription reads: '[... MA]RGARETA : DEI : GRATIA : REGINA : NORVEGIE : ET : SV[ECIE ...].' This translates as 'Margaret, by the Grace of God, Queen of Norway and Sweden' with the remainder of the sentence lost to damage.

In Denmark Margaret was called "sovereign lady and lord and guardian of the entire kingdom of Denmark" (Norway and Sweden later bestowed on her similar titles). This special, double-gendered title bestowed upon the holder the power and authority of a man (lord), of a woman (sovereign lady) and of the gender-neutral guardian. Later, when Erik was elected King of Norway in 1392, she renounced this title in Norway, and in 1396, when he was crowned as King of Denmark and Sweden, she stopped the use of this title altogether, although she continued as Regent.

She only styled herself Queen of Denmark in 1375, usually referring to herself as "Margaret, by the grace of God, daughter of Valdemar King of Denmark" and "Denmark's rightful heir" when referring to her position in Denmark. Her title in Denmark was derived from her father King Valdemar IV of Denmark. Others simply referred to her as the "Lady Queen", without specifying what she was queen of, but not so Pope Boniface IX, who in his letter on 9 September 1390 styled her "our beloved daughter in Christ, Margaret, most excellent queen of Denmark, Sweden and Norway". ("Carissime in Christo filie Margarete Dacie Suecie et Norwegie regine illustri".)

When she married Haakon VI of Norway in 1363, he was co-King of Sweden, making Margaret briefly queen consort of Sweden and queen consort of Norway until Haakon's death. From 24 February 1389 to 28 October 1412, she was Queen of Denmark, Norway and Sweden and founder of the Kalmar Union, which united the Scandinavian countries for over a century. She acted as queen regnant of Denmark, although in those days it was not the Danish custom for a woman to reign.

== Reputation and legacy ==
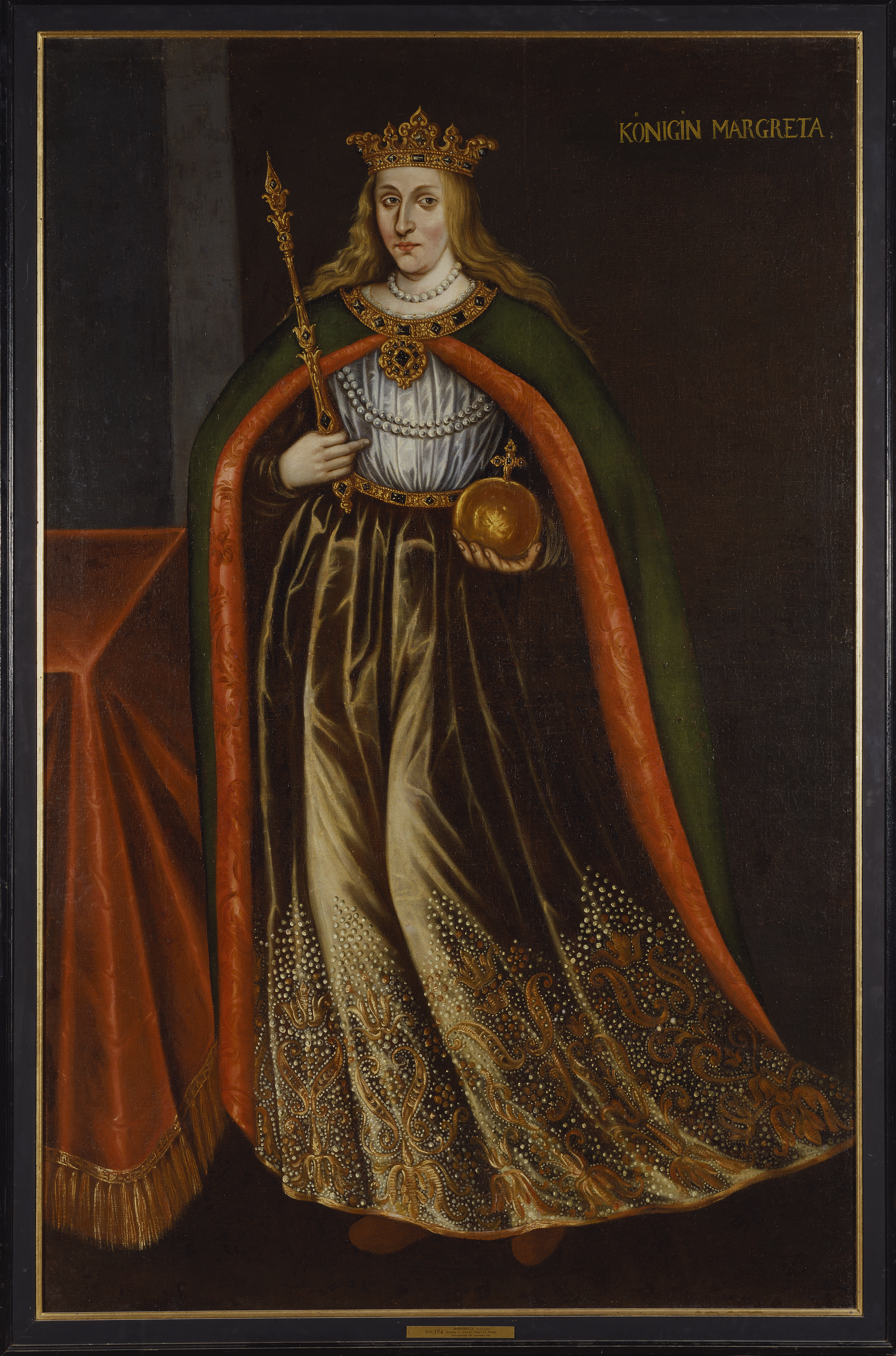
Imaginary portrait of Margaret in coronation robes, posthumous, by an unknown artist and date, currently housed in Nationalmuseum.

E.C. Otte writes in 1874, that "[i]f Margaret could have been certain of being followed on the throne by rulers as able and just as she had been, this Act of the Union of Calmar might have worked for the good of the three kingdoms. For it was quite true, as the Queen said, that each one alone was a poor weak state, open to danger from every side, but that the three united would make a monarchy, strong enough to defy the attacks and schemes of the Hanse traders and all foes from the side of Germany, and would keep the Baltic clear of danger from foreigners. However no ruler came after Queen Margaret equal to her, as there had been none before her to be compared to her."

According to Imsen, her political genius has never been contested, but her motives have always been the target of much debate. During the first half of the nineteenth century, she was usually depicted as an idealist who fought to counterbalance the German influence. After the defeat of Denmark by the Prussians in 1864, the image of Margaret the nationalist prevailed. Later she was increasingly regarded as a Machiavellist who primarily fought for her power and dynastic interests.

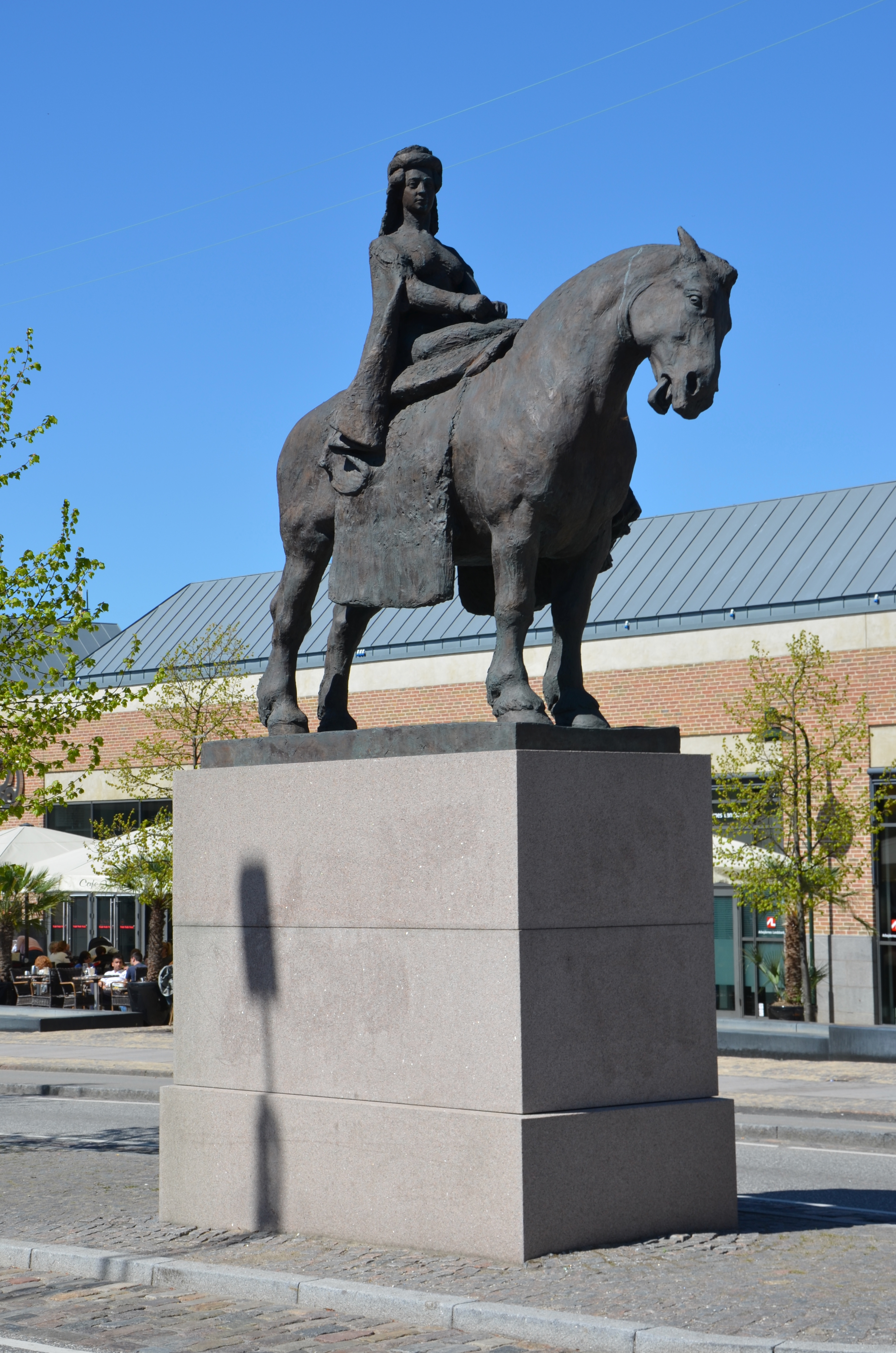
Equestrian statue in Roskilde in eastern Denmark

In Sweden, such a republican (opposed to monarchy) as Vilhelm Moberg lauded Margaret as adverse to warfare and called her the greatest monarch the Nordic countries ever had. Professor Kjell Kumlien wrote in 1949:

She made reality of political plans and aspirations which had previously been tried without nearly as much success by both Swedish and Danish kings. The reason why she succeeded must be sought in no small part in her own eminent political talent, distinguished by strength and endurance as well as flexible and winning negotiating skill. In an uncanny way, her person and deeds are united in the deeply felt communality of the Nordic kingdoms ...

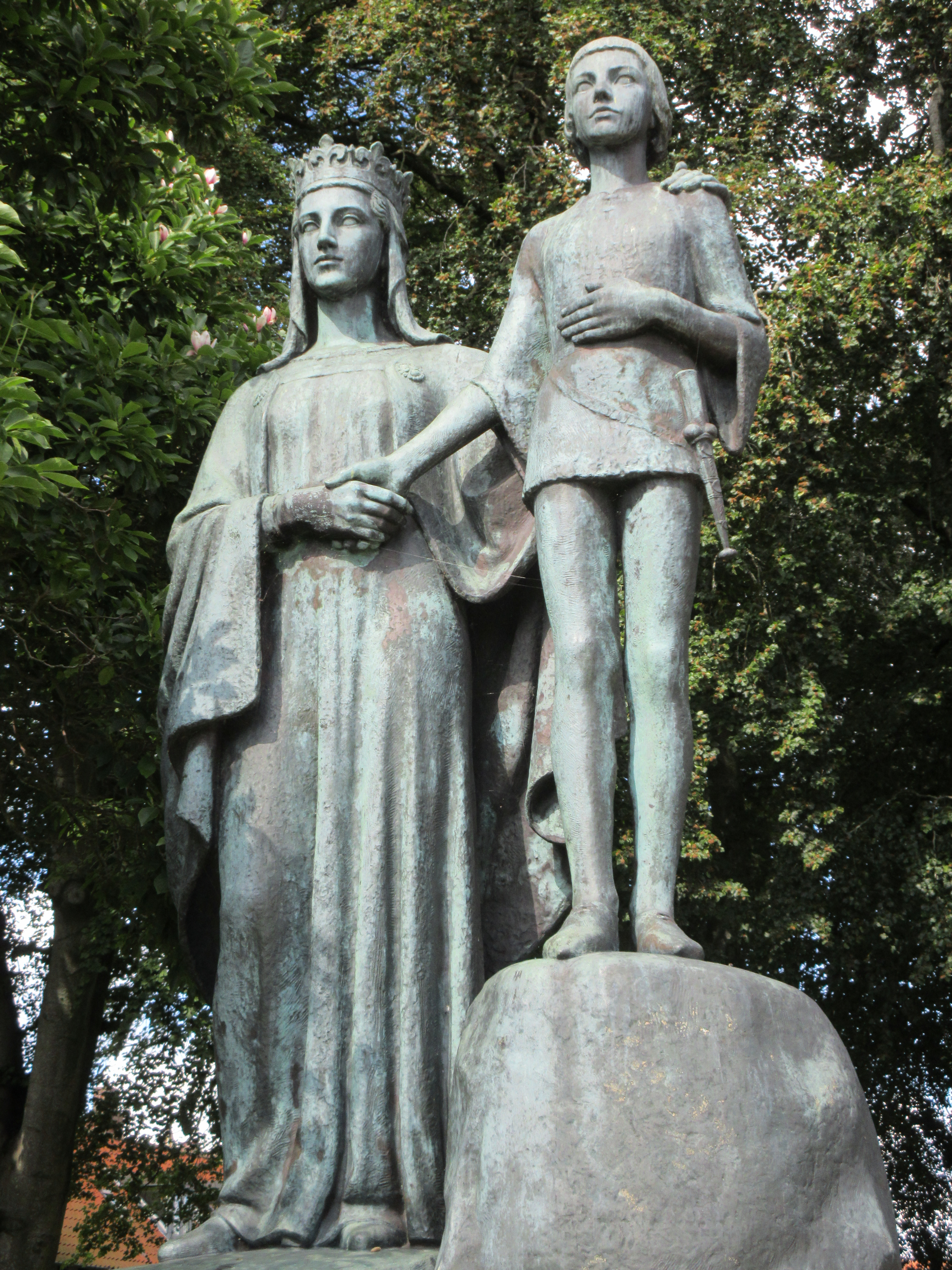
Statue of Margaret and Erik in Viborg, Denmark.

In The Middle Ages: Dictionary of World Biography, Volume 2, McFadden opines that "Margaret's achievement at a time when all Scandinavia was being threatened by German cultural and economic domination was to unite the kingdoms and not only hold back the Germans but also regain lands lost to the south. At the time of her death, the Scandinavian Union was by far the most powerful force in the Baltic; it was also the second largest accumulation of European territory under a single sovereign."

Henrik O. Lunde writes that she was "the most far-sighted ruler in Scandinavia in the pre-Vasa period". Lunde remarks that the reason she united Scandinavia was that she wanted to end the continual warfare between Scandinavian states. Thomas Heebøll-Holm writes that she created the third Danish empire, which was preceded by those of Cnut the Great and Valdemar I.

== In popular culture ==
The 2021 semi-fictional film Margrete: Queen of the North (Danish: Margrete den Første) tells the story of her reign, especially the creation of the Nordic Union army, and speculates about how she dealt with False Olaf.

== Family tree ==
Erik, Duke of Södermanland	Ingeborg of Norway
Blanche of Namur	Magnus IV of Sweden and VII of Norway	Valdemar IV of Denmark	Helvig of Schleswig	Euphemia of Sweden	Albert II, Duke of Mecklenburg
Erik XII of Sweden	Haakon VI of Norway	Margaret I of Denmark	Christopher, Duke of Lolland	Ingeborg of Denmark	Henry III, Duke of Mecklenburg	Albert, King of Sweden
Olaf II of Denmark and IV of Norway	Wartislaw VII, Duke of Pomerania	Maria of Mecklenburg	Albert IV, Duke of Mecklenburg
Erik of Pomerania	Catherine of Pomerania

Margaret House of Estridsen Born: March 1353 Died: 28 October 1412
Royal titles
Preceded by Blanche of Namur	Queen consort of Norway; 1363–1380	Vacant Title next held by Philippa of England
Preceded by Blanche of Namur	Queen consort of Sweden; 1363–1364	Vacant Title next held by Richardis of Schwerin
Regnal titles
Preceded by Olaf IV/Olaf II	Queen regnant of Denmark; 1387–1412 with Erik of Pomerania (1396–1412)	Succeeded by Erik of Pomerania
Preceded by Olaf IV/Olaf II	Queen regnant of Norway; 1388–1412 with Erik of Pomerania (1389–1412)	Succeeded by Erik of Pomerania
Preceded by Albert of Mecklenburg	Queen regnant of Sweden; 1389–1412 with Erik of Pomerania (1396–1412)	Succeeded by Erik of Pomerania
