= Catherine of Pomerania, Countess Palatine of Neumarkt =

Pomeranian princess (c. 1390 – 1426)

Catherine of Pomerania
- Countess Palatine of Neumarkt
- Born: Katharina von Pommern c. 1390; Darłowo
- Died: 4 March 1426 (c. 35-36); Neumarkt in der Oberpfalz
- Spouse: John, Count Palatine of Neumarkt
- Issue: Christopher of Bavaria
- House: Griffin
- Father: Wartislaw VII, Duke of Pomerania
- Mother: Maria of Mecklenburg-Schwerin

Catherine of Pomerania (German: Katharina von Pommern; c. 1390 – 4 March 1426), was a Pomeranian princess, and a Countess Palatine of Neumarkt as the wife of John, Count Palatine of Neumarkt, and the mother of Christopher of Bavaria, king of the Kalmar Union.

== Life ==
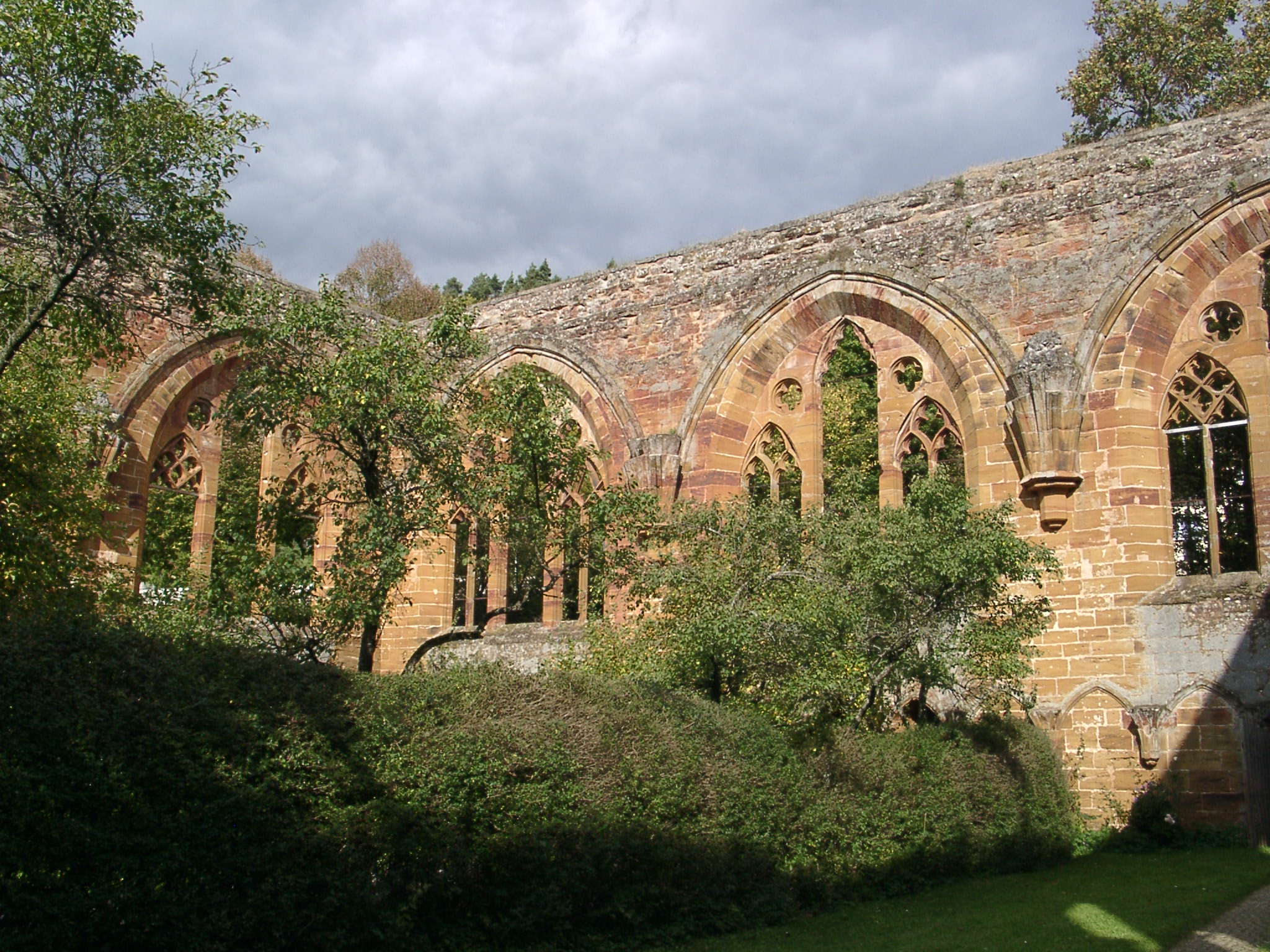
Catherine's remains were buried at Gnadenberg.

Catherine was the daughter of Wartislaw VII, Duke of Pomerania in Pomerania-Stolp and Maria of Mecklenburg-Schwerin. Maria was the daughter of Henry III, Duke of Mecklenburg and Ingeborg of Denmark, eldest daughter of sonless King Valdemar IV of Denmark and older sister of Margaret I of Denmark. Henry III's mother was Euphemia of Sweden, the daughter of Duke Erik Magnusson and the sister of King Magnus Eriksson of Sweden and Norway. Catherine's brother was Erik of Pomerania, future king of Denmark, Sweden, and Norway.

The two siblings were adopted by their grandaunt Queen Margaret I of Denmark in 1388 and likely brought to Margaret at the same occasion. Initially, Margaret's plan was for Catherine to enter the Vadstena Abbey

Catherine was a candidate for a time for marriage to Henry, Prince of Wales. This marriage was suggested in 1400–1401, and it was the idea that a double wedding was to be arranged between Catherine and Henry in parallel to the wedding between her brother Erik and Henry's sister Philippa.

The marriage between Catherine and Henry never occurred and was broken off in 1404. The English had wished for Catherine's children with Henry to inherit the Nordic thrones in the case of Erik dying without an heir (which was impossible since the Kalmar Union was elective), as well as an alliance against France, to which Margaret could not agree. In 1406, another indirect link to the English royal house was created when the brother-in-law of Philippa (Louis III, Elector Palatine) suggested a marriage with John, Count Palatine of Neumarkt. John was the son of Rupert, King of Germany. An alliance with the German king was more valuable for the Nordic Union considering their problem with the Hanseatic League. The negotiations were completed in one year, and Margaret gave Catherine a dowry of 4,000 gulden, much less than was expected by her future father-in-law.

On 15 August 1407, Catherine married John in Ribe, Denmark. They would have seven children, but only their youngest, Christopher, lived past infancy. Christopher succeeded his uncle Erik as king of the three Scandinavian kingdoms.

Catherine died on 4 March 1426.
