= Dalaborg =

Castle ruins in Mellerud, Götaland, Sweden

- Sweden
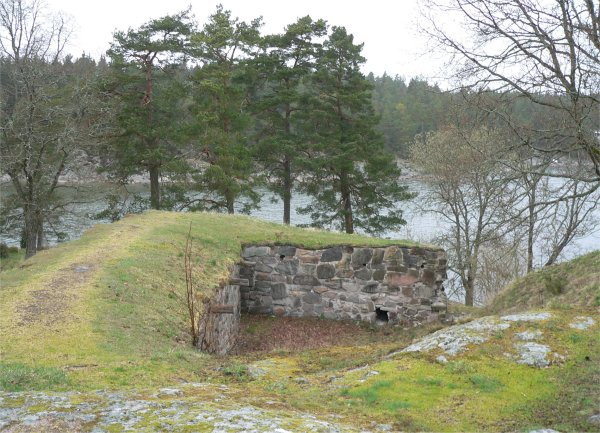

Site information
- Type: Castle ruins

Location
- Coordinates: 58°36′12″N 12°36′20″E

Dalaborg (Dalaborgs slottsruin) is the ruins of a castle in Mellerud Municipality in Götaland, Sweden. It is located north of the Dalbergsån outlet of Lake Vänern in the Swedish traditional province of Dalsland.

== History ==
Dalaborg was built in 1304 by the Dukes Erik Magnusson and Valdemar Magnusson, sons of King Magnus Ladulås, on the western coast of Sweden. It was destroyed in 1434 during the Engelbrekt feud with Eric of Pomerania.

It was at Dalaborg that Queen Margareta, regent of Norway and Denmark, was recognised as regent of Sweden in 1388. The moat, ramparts, a terrace and the cellar of a blockhouse still survive. A model of Dalaborg can be seen at the Mellerud Museum in Mellerud, Sweden.

== See also ==
- List of castles in Sweden
