= Henrik Reventlow =

Henrik Tagesen Reventlow (fl. 15th century; died 12 June 1441), from Funen, was a supporter of King Eric and the leader of a peasant army. During the reign of King Christopher III of Denmark, he led an army of 25,000 in a peasant revolt.

== Peasant revolt ==
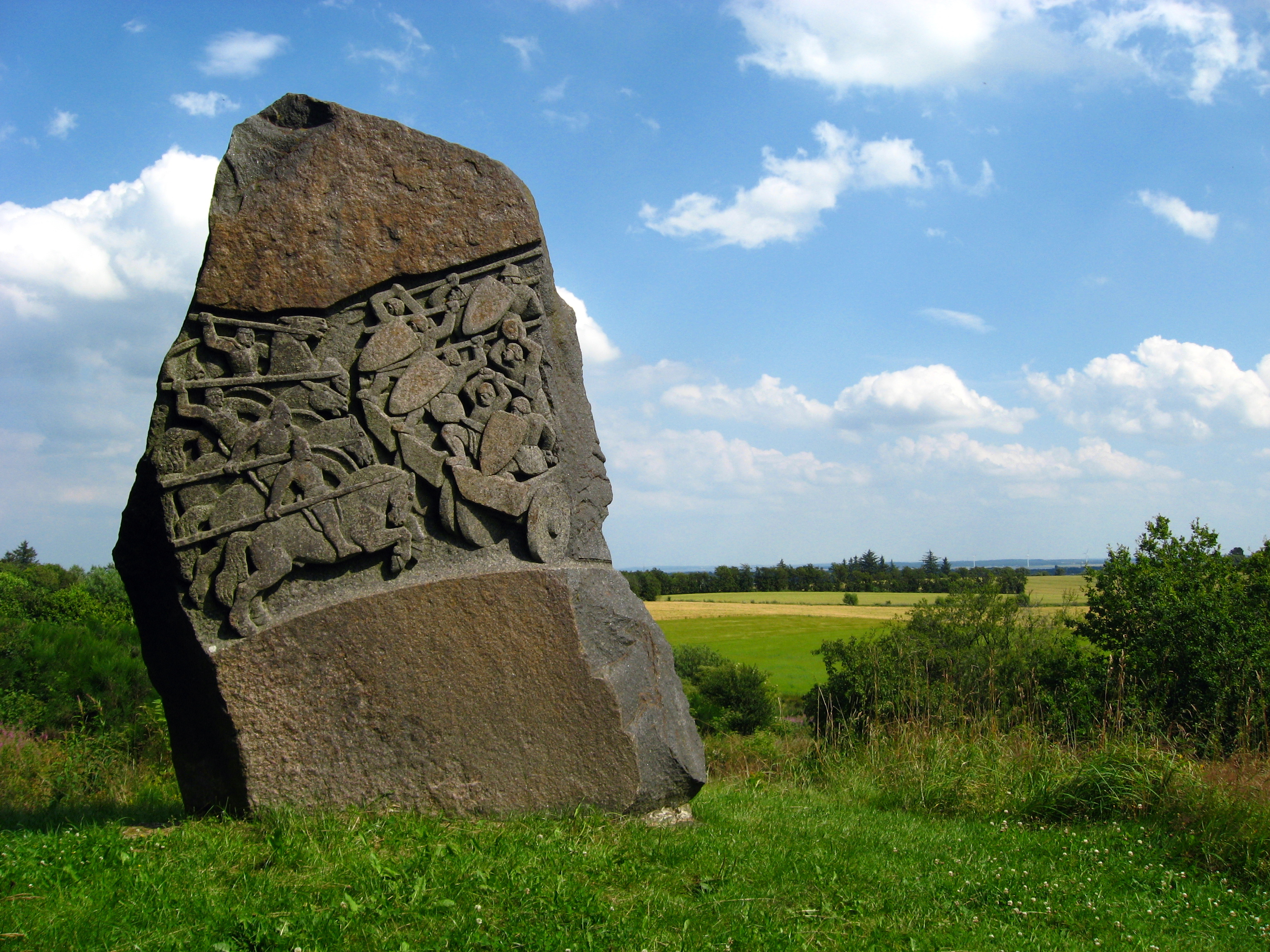
The memorial stone for the peasant rebellion in 1441 at Husby Hole, Denmark.

The great peasant uprising had raged for several years in Northern Jutland. In 1436 peasants from Skåne refused to pay an extra defense tax for military efforts against the Swedes and in 1441 open revolt broke out most likely triggered by the high taxes. Due to peasants unrest on Zealand, the Rigsråd councillors complained to King Christopher III of Denmark. Legend has it that allegedly Vendel dwellers won the first battle of St Jørgensbjerg and burned down several of Hanherred's estates. In a following decisive Battle of Sankt Jørgensbjerg on 6 June 1441 the peasants were soundly defeated.

Henrik Tagesen Reventlow was captured and executed on 12 June 1441.
