= Ingeborg of Denmark =

Ingeborg of Denmark may refer to:

- Ingeborg of Denmark, Queen of France (1174–1237), wife of Philip II of France and daughter of Valdemar I of Denmark
- Ingeborg of Denmark, Queen of Norway (ca. 1244–1287), wife of Magnus VI of Norway and daughter of Eric IV of Denmark
- Ingeborg of Denmark, Duchess of Mecklenburg (1347–1370), wife of Henry III, Duke of Mecklenburg, daughter of Valdemar IV of Denmark
- Ingeborg of Denmark, Duchess of Västergötland (1878–1958), wife of Prince Carl of Sweden, Duke of Västergötland, daughter Frederick VIII of Denmark
