= Christopher of Sweden =

Christopher of Sweden - Swedish: Kristoffer and Kristofer - may refer to:

- Christopher III of Denmark, also King of Sweden 1440
- Christopher Vasa, Swedish prince 1598, son of King Sigmund, his mother the Queen and he both died at his birth
