= Albert IV =

Albert IV may refer to:

- Albert IV of Tyrol (c. 1180–1253)
- Albert IV of Habsburg (c. 1188–1239)
- Albert IV of Saxe-Lauenburg (1315–1343)
- Albert IV of Mecklenburg (before 1363–1388)
- Albert IV of Austria (1377–1404)
- Albert IV of Anhalt-Köthen (died 1423)
- Albert IV, Margrave of Meissen (1443–1500)
- Albert IV of Bavaria (1447–1508)
- Albert IV of Saxe-Eisenach (1599–1644)
