= Treaty of Nyborg (1386) =

1386 treaty in Denmark

- Context: Succession to the Duchy of Schleswig
- Signed: 15 August 1384
- Location: Nyborg
- Negotiators: (Medieval Denmark) Margaret I (Medieval Denmark) King Oluf; Nicholas I Gerhard VI
- Parties: Denmark; Holstein-Rendsburg

The Treaty of Nyborg (Danish: Freden i Nyborg, German: Vertrag von Nyborg), also known as the Meeting at Nyborg (Danish: Mødet i Nyborg), was a peace treaty between Queen Margaret I of Denmark and the German dukes, Henry II and Nicholas I, Count of Holstein-Rendsburg on a territorial and successional dispute in Schleswig. The treaty was signed during a meeting in Nyborg on Funen on 15 August 1386 and stated that the Holsteinians were to hold the Duchy of Schleswig for eternity.

== Background ==
In 1375, Schleswig was roughly split between Henry, Duke of Schleswig in the North, and the Counts of Holstein-Rendsburg, Henry II and Nicholas I in the South. However, after the death of Duke Henry of Schleswig the same year, the northern part of Schleswig laid open to Holsteinian invasion. Queen Margaret, who was the de facto leader of Denmark and Norway, was unable to secure Denmark's southern border since she had all her resources and attention elsewhere. Subsequently, the two dukes invaded Northern Schleswig, quickly taking the island of Als and the two towns of Haderslev and Tønder. The occupation would only be officially confirmed by Denmark years later in 1386, when the two parties would meet at Nyborg.

== Treaty and Stipulations ==
At Nyborg, King Oluf and Margaret would grant the Duchy of Schleswig to the sons of Henry II of Holstein-Rendsburg, who had died earlier in the year, and Oluf and Margaret would concurrently reconcile with Count Nicholas I. The German, Presbyter Bremensis, would give a detailed description of the stipulations in his Chronicon Holtzatiae:

1. The Holsteinians were to Hereditary hold the Duchy of Schleswig for eternity.
2. A man of the count's family would always be lord and Duke of Schleswig.
3. Both sides were not to permit any rivalry.
4. The castle of Tranekær on Lolland was to be held by the Danish King for three years, during which period the Holsteinians would rule the Frisians. After three years, the situation could remain unchanged, or, if both parties agreed, they could exchange roles.
5. If war occurred, both were to aid each other against the enemies if requested.

== Aftermath ==
Margaret would, however, invade Schleswig in 1404 after the death of Count Gerhard VI. Here, Margaret would spend much of the rest of her life combatting the Holsteinians, and it would also be here, specifically in Flensburg, where she would die presumeable from the Bubonic plague.

== See also ==
- Treaty of Stralsund (1370) – 1370 peace treaty between Denmark and the Hanseatic League
- Holstein-Pinneberg – countship
- Siege of Kolding (1368–1369) – Siege in Denmark, 1369
- Battle of Nonnebjerg – 1340 battle in Denmark

== Works cited ==
- Etting, Vivian (2004). "The Counts of Holstein and Southern Jutland". Queen Margrete I, 1353-1412, and the Founding of the Nordic Union. Brill.
- Higgins, Sophia Elizabeth (1885). Women of Europe in the Fifteenth and Sixteenth Centuries. Hurst and Blackett. ISBN 978-0-7222-1702-3.
