= Maria of Mecklenburg-Schwerin =

Danish duchess (c. 1363–1402)

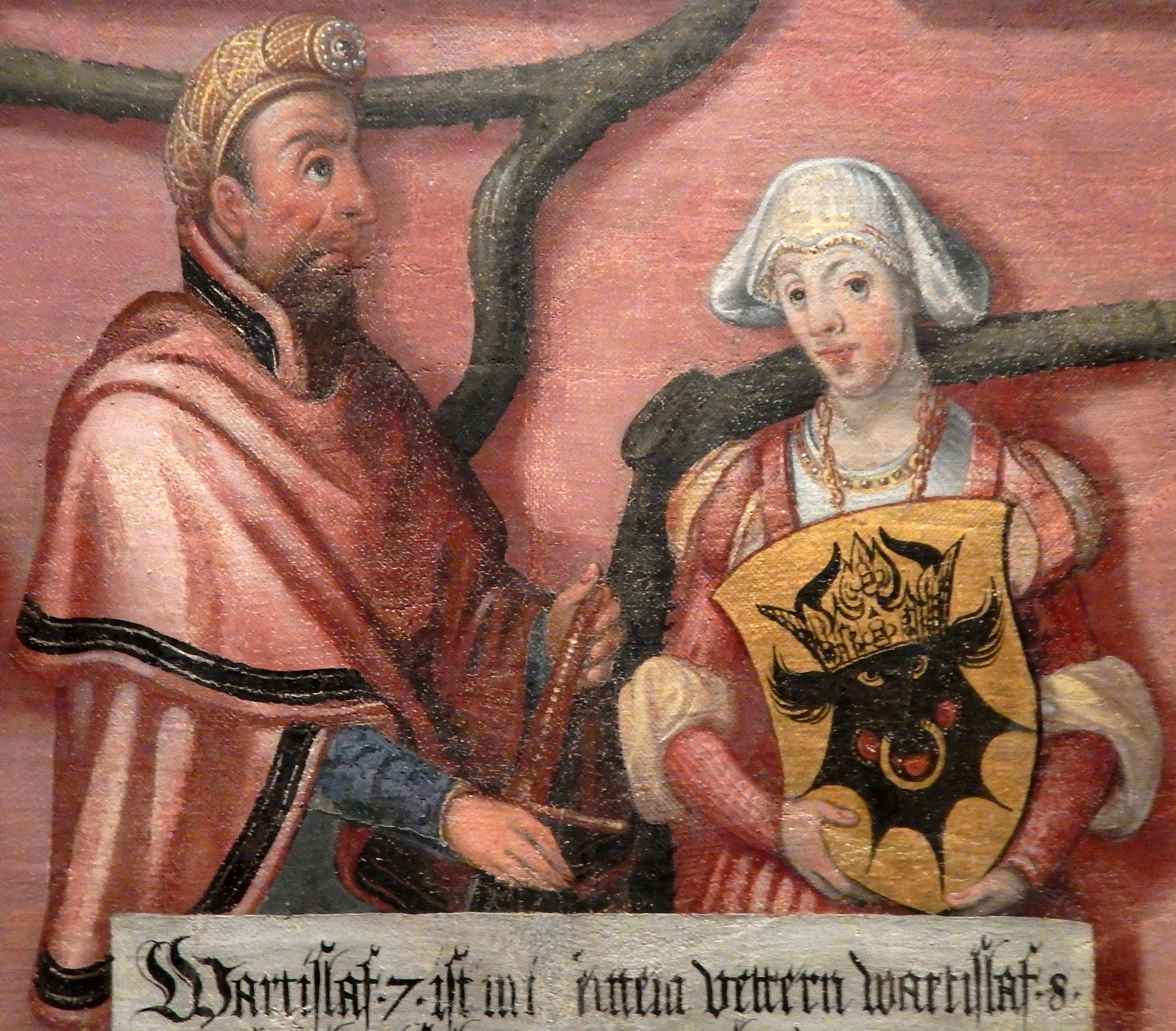
- Maria von Mecklenburg and her husband Wartislaw VII on the picture family tree of the griffins by Cornelius Krommeny (1598)
- Born: c. 1363–1367
- Died: after 13 May 1402
- Noble family: House of Mecklenburg
- Spouse: Wartislaw VII, Duke of Pomerania
- Issue: Erik of Pomerania; Catherine of Pomerania
- Father: Henry III, Duke of Mecklenburg
- Mother: Ingeborg of Denmark, Duchess of Mecklenburg

Marie of Mecklenburg (born c. 1363–1367, died after 13 May 1402) was a duchess of Pomerania. She was the daughter of Duke Henry III of Mecklenburg (died 1383) and Princess Ingeborg of Denmark (died 1370), elder sister of Queen Margrete I of Denmark.

== History ==
She married 1380, before March 23, with Duke Wartislaw VII of Pomerania (died c. 1394–1395) and together they had one son and a daughter:

- Bogusław (c. 1382–1459), better known as the Kalmar Union King Erik of Pomerania; and,
- Catherine (c. 1390–1426), married to Count palatine John, Count Palatine of Neumarkt (c. 1383–1443).

Maria was also possibly the heir to her aunt, the Nordic Union Queen Margaret I of Denmark.

== See also ==
- House of Knýtlinga
