= Treaty of Pyzdry =

1390 treaty between Poland and Pomerania-Stolp

- Signed: November 2, 1390
- Location: Pyzdry, Poland
- Original signatories: King Władysław II Jagiełło; Duke Wartislaw VII
- Parties: Kingdom of Poland Duchy of Słupsk

The Treaty of Pyzdry was signed on 2 November 1390 between Władysław II Jagiełło, king of Poland and Wartislaw VII of Pomerania-Stolp (Duchy of Słupsk). The treaty, signed in Pyzdry, contained an oath of vassalage of Wartislaw to Jagiełło, the obligation to support the latter in the Polish-Teutonic War, and mutual trade alleviations for Pomeranian and Polish merchants. Wartislaw VII, who with his brothers was allied with the Teutonic Order before, received the Polish castellany of Nakło and probably some adjacent areas as a fief.

== Interpretation of the treaty ==
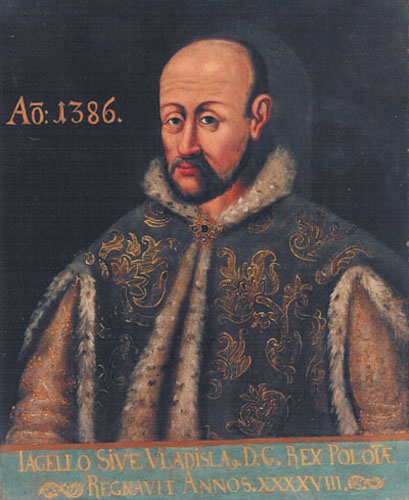
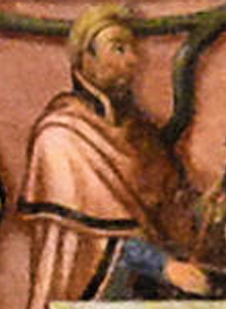
King Władysław II Jagiełło and Duke Wartislaw VII, signatories of the treaty

Since the treaty does not specify the oath of vassalage of Wartislaw VII to Jagiello, different interpretations of the treaty are offered by historians:

- Gòrski (1947), Labuda (1948), Bardach (1960), Fenrych (1961) and Czaplinski (1970) said the oath was for all territory held by Wartislaw VII, including Pomerania-Stolp;
- Mitkowski (1946), Zientara (1969) and Jasienica (1978) said the oath was for the territory Waritislaw received as fiefs from Jagiełło (especially Nakło);
- Mielcarz (1976) said the oath was binding only Wartislaw himself, as a person, to Jagiełło;
- Gumowski (1951) said the document shows Wartislaw giving a general solemn promise of service.

In recent historiography, Kosman (1995) interprets the treaty in a way that Pomerania-Stolp became a Polish fief, while Dzięgielewski (1995), Czacharowski (2001) and Buchholz (1999) say the treaty was an alliance and the oath refers to Nakło being held as a Polish fief. Piskorski (1999) says that after the Duchy of Pomerania retained the Imperial immediacy it had gained in 1348 throughout the 14th and 15th centuries. With respect to the discourse in Polish historiography, Branig and Buchholz (1997) say that however the treaty is interpreted, it did not have any significance for the future.

== Aftermath ==
During the Polish-Teutonic wars, the Pomeranian dukes changed sides between Poland and the knights very frequently. Wartislaw's brothers Barnim V and Bogislaw VIII took on a friendly attitude towards the Teutonic Order, and Naklo returned to the Polish Crown after Wartislaw's death. Wartislaw went on a pilgrimage in 1392/1393, and died either in 1394 or 1395.
