= Ingeborg of Denmark, Duchess of Mecklenburg =

Ingeborg of Denmark
- Duchess of Mecklenburg
- Born: 4 January 1347; Sønderborg Castle, Als, Denmark
- Died: 16 June 1370 (aged 23); Mecklenburg?
- Spouse: Henry III of Mecklenburg
- Issue: Albert IV, Duke of Mecklenburg; Maria, Duchess of Pomerania
Names
- Ingeborg Valdemarsdatter
- House: Estridsen
- Father: Valdemar IV, King of Denmark
- Mother: Helvig of Schleswig

Ingeborg of Denmark (Danish: Ingeborg Valdemarsdatter) (4 January 1347 – 16 June 1370) was the eldest daughter of Valdemar IV of Denmark and Helvig of Schleswig. By marriage, she was Duchess of Mecklenburg, although she died before her husband succeeded her father-in-law. She was a potential heiress to the Danish throne and the older sister of Margaret I of Denmark.

== Biography ==
Ingeborg was betrothed to Duke Henry III of Mecklenburg after the death of Ingeborg's older sister Margaret in 1350, who was betrothed to the Duke. She had two sisters named Margaret. The marriage contract between Henry and Ingeborg was established in Dornburg on 23 October 1350. Ingeborg and Henry then married in 1362. They had the following children:

- Euphemia (d. 1400), married to John V, Prince of Mecklenburg-Werle
- Albert IV (1362–1388), Duke of Mecklenburg-Schwerin, married to Elisabeth of Holstein
- Maria (1363–1403), wife of Wartislaw VII, Duke of Pomerania
- Ingeborg (1368–1408), a nun in Ribnitz 1376, where she was the abbess 1395–1408

Ingeborg was a potential heir to the Danish throne in 1363 upon the death of her only surviving brother, Christopher, Duke of Lolland. However, Denmark was an elective monarchy, and Ingeborg too predeceased King Valdemar. Ingeborg's father died without appointing an heir. The succession to the Danish throne was disputed. The Estates of Denmark met at Odense to elect the next king. The nobles were divided between either electing Ingeborg's son Albert IV, put forth by his grandfather Albert II, Duke of Mecklenburg; Margaret's son Olaf II, heir to the Norwegian throne; or choosing a new dynasty. The estates were eventually won over by Queen Margaret's charm and popularity, as the only surviving daughter of the deceased king, and along with the potential of a union with Norway and anti-German sentiments, Olaf II was elected as King of Denmark in 1376 with Queen Margaret as regent. With Albert III, Duke of Mecklenburg, Ingeborg's brother-in-law, on the Swedish throne, the Danish may not want another Mecklenburg ruler in Scandinavia.

Ingeborg's grandson Eric of Pomerania, inherited the rights of his grandmother and succeeded as King of Denmark in 1396 with Margaret as his regent. He became the first monarch of the Kalmar Union between Denmark, Norway, and Sweden. Her last surviving descendant was Christopher of Bavaria, who succeeded Eric as ruler of the Kalmar Union.
