= Cecilia (royal mistress) =

Danish lady-in-waiting (died after 1459)

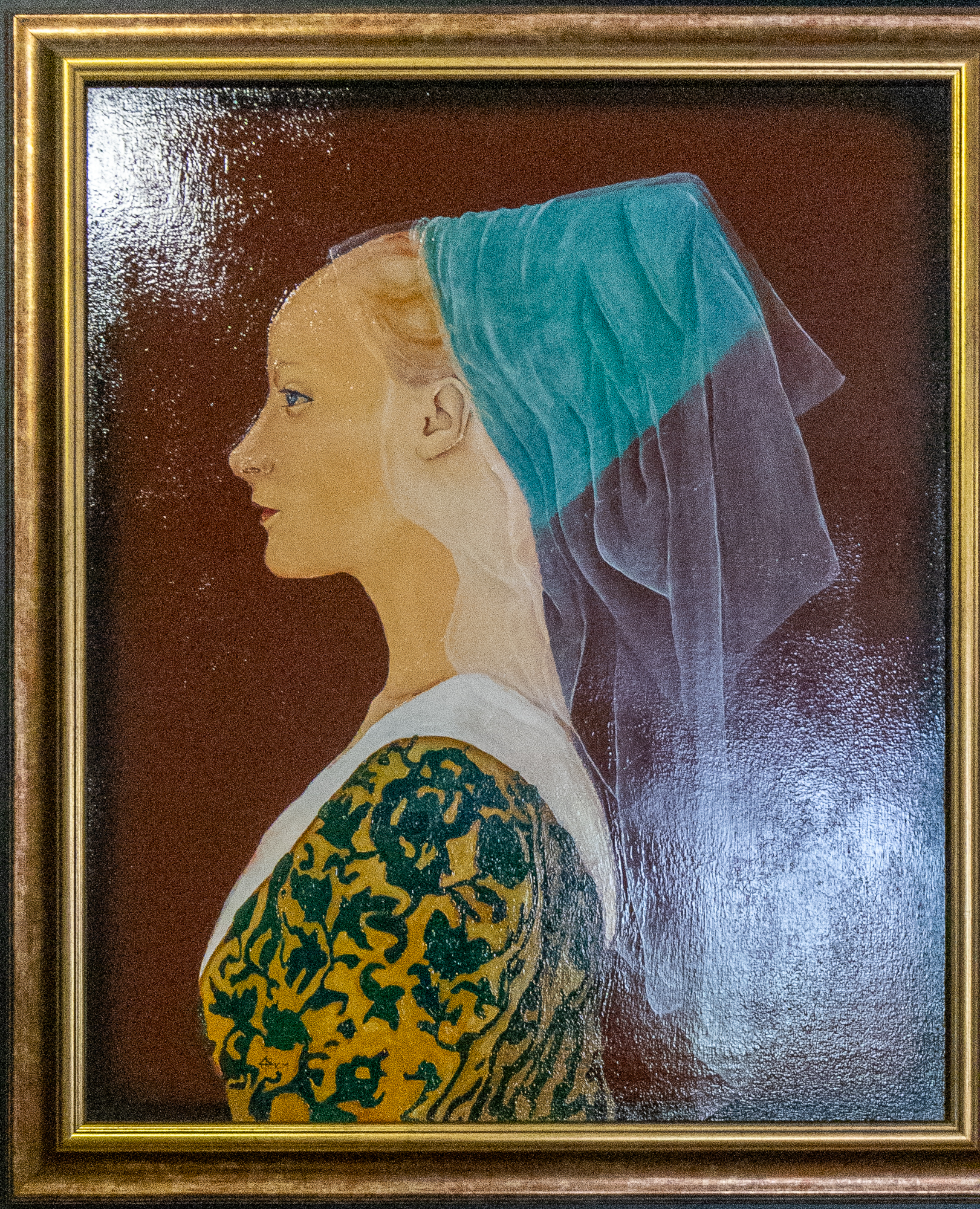
Portrait of unknown origin uploaded to Wikimedia Commons by a young Polish man

Cecilia (died after 1459) was a Danish lady-in-waiting at the court of Philippa of England, Queen Consort of Denmark, Norway, and Sweden, and later the mistress and morganatic wife of Philippa’s widower King Eric.

== Biography ==
The parenthood of Cecilia is not mentioned. Little is known of her personally. She is noted to have been the maid-of-honor to Queen Philippa. Such position would mean that she was likely a member of the nobility.

Cecilia’s relationship with Eric is first noted in the historical record after the death of Queen Philippa in 1430. The relationship reportedly had the "character of a marriage" from the beginning. The affair was apparently well known and considered so scandalous at the time that the royal council included it in its official list of complaints against the King. One reason for the disapproval was reportedly that the marriage, for some reason, was taken as an indicator that king Eric favored Boguslav of Pomerania as his heir and the introduction of non-elective monarchy.

A legendary story has the riksråd nobleman Oluf Axelsen Thott overturning her carriage, striking her three times with a sword, and ordering her to carry his compliments to King Eric, adding that she would one day cause the King to be separated from Denmark. No children are known from the union.

Cecilia was described as loyal, and accompanied Eric to Gotland when he was deposed in 1439, and from Gotland to Pomerania in 1450. At some point, she reportedly married the king. The date of her marriage is unknown. The only evidence of her marriage to Eric is in a record of a donation made to a Pomeranian convent, the Cartesian Abbey Marienkron by Rügenwalde, which first referred to her as only Cecilia, then as uxor regis ('King's Wife') and, in 1459, as domina Cecilia regina ('Lady Queen Cecilia'). King Eric died in 1459, and Cecilia reportedly outlived him though this is the last year in which she is mentioned.
