= Cornelius Krommeny =

Dutch painter (died 1599)

- Born: 16th century Zaanstad (presumably)
- Died: 1599
- Occupation: Court painter

Cornelius Krommeny (c. 16th century – 1599) was a Dutch painter, who served as a court painter in Mecklenburg-Güstrow, best known for his portraits of Elizabeth of Denmark, Duchess of Mecklenburg, Maria of Mecklenburg-Schwerin, Philippa of England, and Wartislaw VI. He was presumably born in Zaanstad.
