= Christopher of Bavaria =

Scandinavian king under the Kalmar Union (1416–1448)

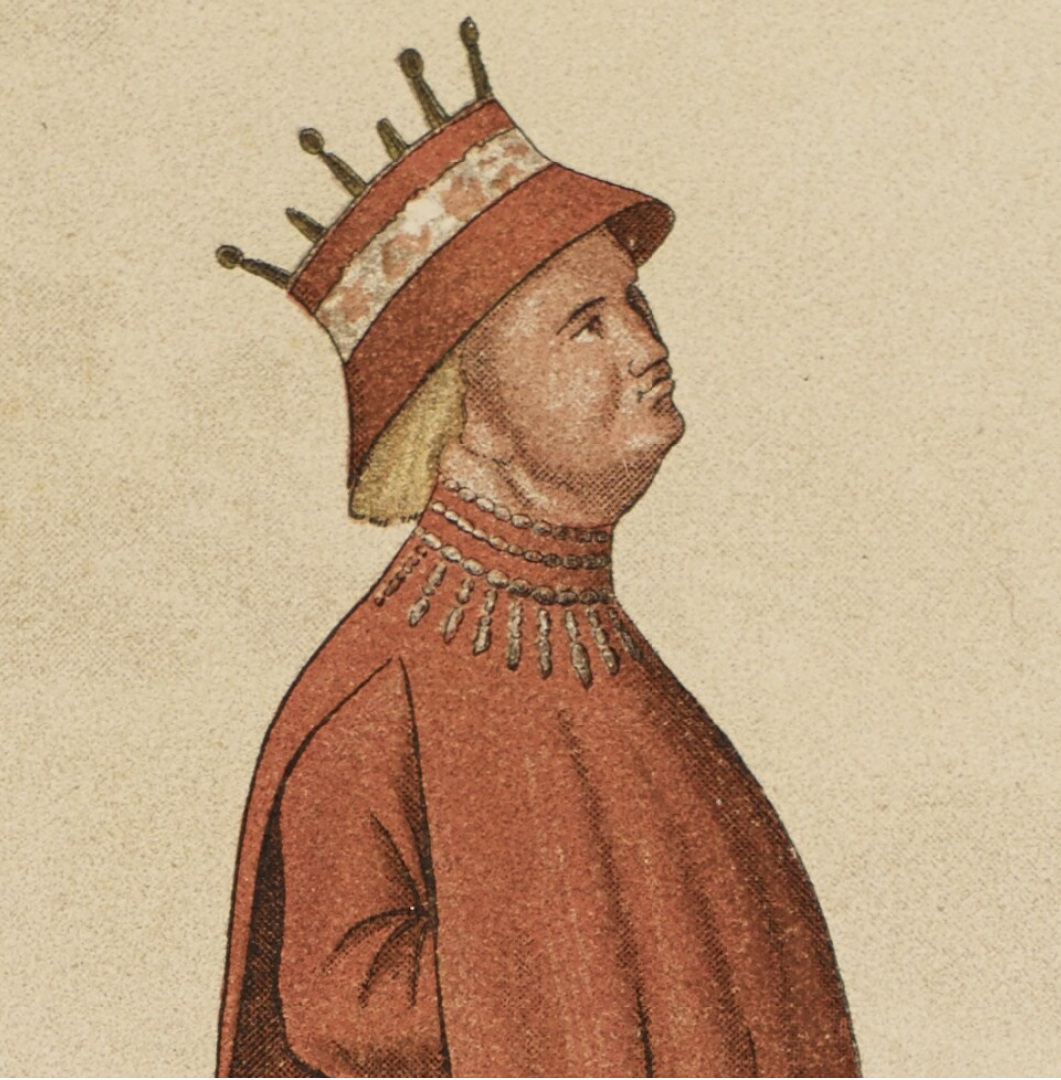

King of Denmark
- Reign: 9 April 1440 – 5 January 1448
- Coronation: 1 January 1443; Ribe Cathedral
- Predecessor: Erik of Pomerania
- Successor: Christian I

King of Sweden
- Reign: 1441 – 5 January 1448
- Coronation: 13 September 1441 in Uppsala
- Predecessor: Erik of Pomerania
- Successor: Karl Knutsson

King of Norway
- Reign: June 1442 – 5 January 1448
- Coronation: 2 July 1442 in Oslo
- Predecessor: Erik of Pomerania
- Successor: Karl Knutsson

Count of Palatinate-Neumarkt
- Reign: 1443–1448
- Predecessor: John, Count Palatine of Neumarkt
- Successor: Otto I, Count Palatine of Mosbach
- Born: 26 February 1416; Neumarkt in der Oberpfalz
- Died: 5/6 January 1448 (aged 31); Helsingborg
- Burial: Roskilde Cathedral, Roskilde
- Spouse: Dorothea of Brandenburg (m. 1445)
- House: Wittelsbach (Note: A member of the House of Palatinate-Neumarkt, a branch of the Wittelsbach dynasty.)
- Father: John, Count Palatine of Neumarkt
- Mother: Catherine of Pomerania

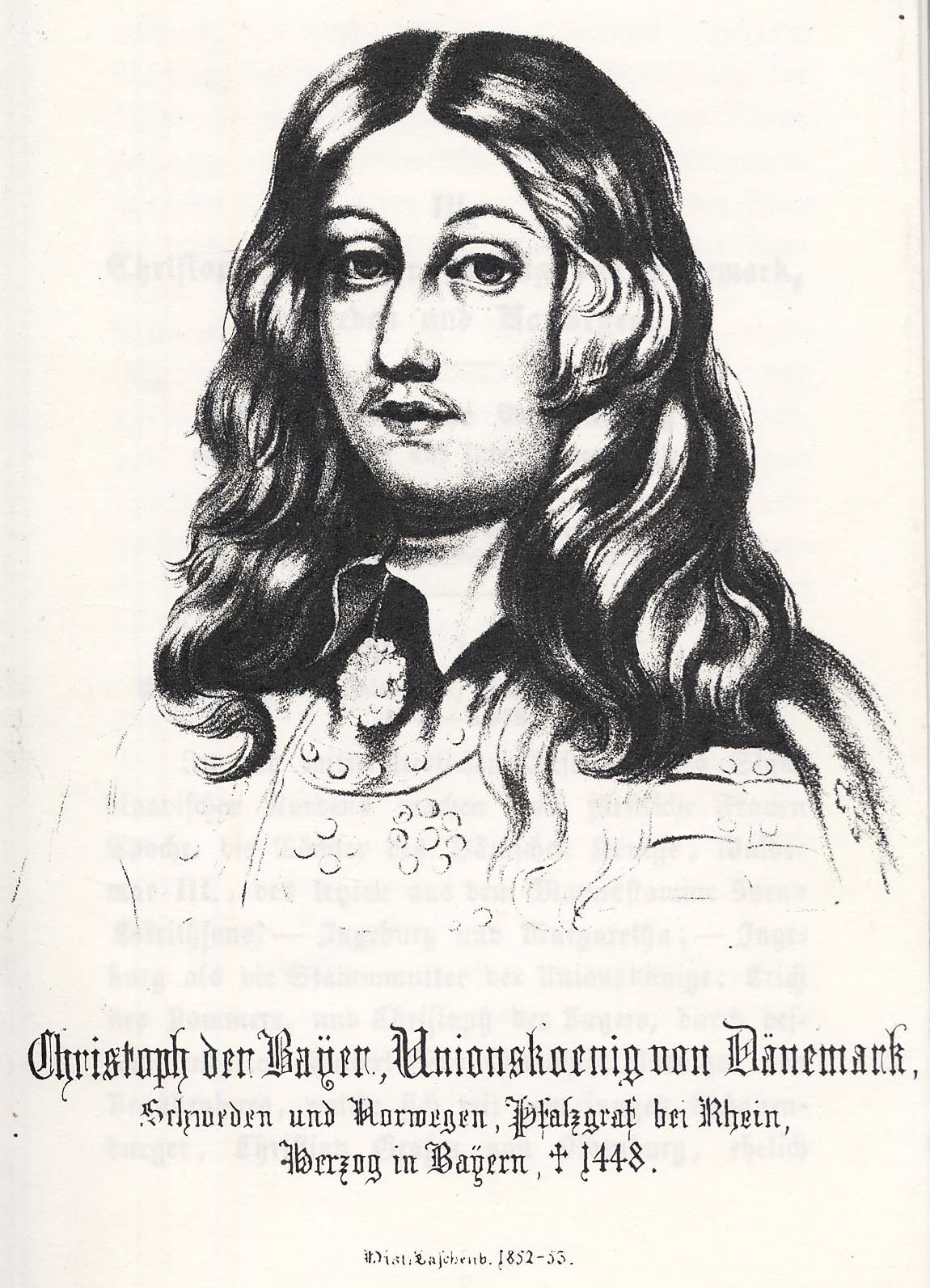
Christopher as portrayed in an 1850s German publication

Christopher of Bavaria (Danish and Norwegian: Christoffer; Swedish: Kristofer; 26 February 1416 – 5/6 January 1448) was King of Denmark (1440–1448, as Christopher III), Sweden (1441–1448), and Norway (1442–1448) during the Kalmar Union. He ruled after the Kalmar Union's King Erik of Pomerania was deposed. Early in his reign, he put down two peasant rebellions in Funen and Jutland. He was disliked by the Swedish nobles, as they pointed to his inability to manage harvest failures and to stop Erik's plundering. They also questioned his foreign background.

== Biography ==
=== Coming to power ===
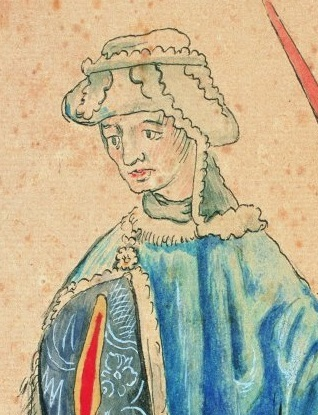
Christopher's father, Count Palatine John

Christopher was the son of John, Count Palatine of Neumarkt (1383–1443), and Catherine of Pomerania (c. 1390–1426). Catherine was the daughter of Wartislaw VII, Duke of Pomerania, in Pomerania-Stolp, and sister of the Scandinavian king, Erik of Pomerania. Count Palatine John was the son of King Rupert of Germany (1352–1410). Christopher was probably born at Neumarkt in der Oberpfalz in Upper Palatinate, in Bavaria, Germany. In 1445, Christopher married Dorothea of Brandenburg (1430 – 25 November 1495) in Copenhagen.

Erik of Pomerania was deposed as king of Denmark and Sweden in 1439. Erik's nephew, Christopher, who was rather unfamiliar with Scandinavian conditions, was elected by the Danish State Council as the successor to his uncle, first as regent from 1439, and then proclaimed King of Denmark at the Viborg Assembly (Danish landsting) on 9 April 1440. He was meant to be a puppet, as evidenced by the saying: "Had the Council demanded the stars of heaven from him, he would have ordered it." However he succeeded in maintaining some personal control. As a whole his rule, according to the politics of the nobility and his succession, might be called the start of the long period of balance between royal power and nobility which lasted until 1660. He was later elected king of Sweden in 1441, and Norway in June 1442.

For himself Christopher used the otherwise unknown title of arch king (archirex), because in his opinion he ruled an empire, not simply three different countries, and thus ranked immediately under the European emperor.

=== Peasant rebellions ===
At the start of his reign, he put down peasant rebellions in Funen and Jutland. Once the rebellion on Funen was suppressed, he turned his attention the uprising in Jutland. North Jutland, especially Vendsyssel, was so restive that a peasant army of 25,000 led by Henrik Tagesen Reventlow (executed 1441) posed a serious threat to Christopher's continued reign. Before the king could act, Jutland's noble families raised their own army and marched west of Aalborg to meet Reventlow's forces.

The peasants had created a gigantic wagon fortress three layers deep to protect themselves from the mounted knights they knew would come against them. They also placed tree branches across the bog in front of the camp and then cast earth on top to make it look like solid ground. The overconfident army of nobles led by Eske Jensen Brock appeared at St Jorgen's Hill (St. Jørgensbjerg) on 3 May 1441. The knights charged the camp, and were quickly mired down in the bog. The peasants moved in for the kill. Brock was killed in the Battle of St Jorgen's Hill (Slaget ved Skt. Jørgensbjerg) and dismembered and the pieces sent to the towns in the area as a warning. The peasants then raided Aalborghus (the area's most important manor) forcing the noble Niels Guldenstierne to flee.

The treatment of the captives after the battle strengthened Christopher's determination to put down the peasants. With his own army Christopher rode north to the rebel camp at Husby Hole near St Jorgen's Hill in northern Jutland. Because the rebels outnumbered his troops, Christopher sent word that anyone who left the camp and went home would not be punished for rebellion. The men from the island of Mors and Thisted left, for which they were called cowards and traitors ever after. Christopher ordered the attack on the rebel camp on 8 June 1441 and despite fighting ferociously the rebels could not overcome the heavily armed knights. Thousands of rebels were killed, those who survived were fined heavily. The more severe consequence was that rebels lost their free status and became serfs on the farms where they worked. The king made it a capital crime for peasants to carry weapons longer than a short knife. The subjugation of Denmark's once free peasants was complete.

=== Coronation, relations with Swedes ===
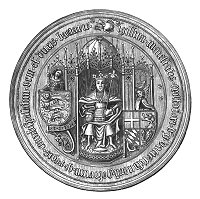
King Christopher's royal seal

In May 1442, Christopher traveled to Lödöse to meet with the nobles from all three kingdoms. He was elected King of Norway there and then went to Oslo where he was crowned on 2 July 1442. The next year he was proclaimed King of Denmark at the Urnehoved Assembly near Ribe. When his residence at Roskilde burned down, Christopher moved to Copenhagen and made it the capital of Denmark.

The Swedish nobles were not happy to relinquish any power and thus did not like him, claiming he was too German for them and that he allowed his uncle (ex-King Erik) to plunder shipping from his castle on Gotland without any attempt to stop him. They blamed a series of bad harvests on him. People were so hungry they mixed ground tree bark with the little flour they could find. Christopher was contemptuously nicknamed the "Bark King" in Sweden. On the other hand, he tried to support the cities and their merchants as far as the limits of nobility and Hanseatic cities allowed. During his reign Copenhagen was made permanently the capital of Denmark (municipal charter of 1443).

He carried on an ineffective policy of war and negotiations with Erik in Gotland did little to help the dissatisfaction within both Sweden and the Hanseatic League. The Kalmar Union Treaty was changed so that the aristocracy had most of the policy-making powers, and the king lost many of the powers that monarchs had acquired since Viking times. The results of this policy of balance were still not reached when he suddenly died as the last descendant of Valdemar IV of Denmark.

=== Death ===
Christopher died suddenly at Helsingborg in January 1448 at age 31. King Christopher was buried in Roskilde Cathedral. His widow, Queen Dorothea, married the new king of Denmark, Christian I.

== Other sources ==
- Dansk Biografisk Leksikon, vol. 7, Copenhagen 1980.
- Politikens Danmarkshistorie, vol. 4 by Erik Kjersgaard, Copenhagen 1962.
- Politikens bog om Danske Monarker by Benito Scocozza, Copenhagen 1998.

Christopher of Bavaria House of Palatinate-Neumarkt Cadet branch of the House of Wittelsbach Born: 26 February 1416 Died: 5/6 January 1448
Regnal titles
Vacant Title last held by Erik of Pomerania	King of Denmark; 1440–1448	Vacant Title next held by Christian I
Vacant Title last held by Erik of Pomerania	King of Sweden; 1441–1448	Vacant Title next held by Karl Knutsson
Vacant Title last held by Erik of Pomerania	King of Norway; 1442–1448	Vacant Title next held by Karl Knutsson
Preceded by John	Count Palatine of Neumarkt; 1443–1448	Succeeded by Otto I
