= Henry III of Mecklenburg =

German noble (c. 1337–1383)

Henry III, Duke of Mecklenburg
- Born: c. 1337
- Died: 24 April 1383; Schwerin Castle
- Buried: Doberan Minster
- Noble family: House of Mecklenburg
- Spouses: Ingeborg of Denmark; Matilda of Werle
- Issue: Albert IV, Duke of Mecklenburg; Euphemia; Maria of Mecklenburg-Schwerin; Ingeborg
- Father: Albert II, Duke of Mecklenburg
- Mother: Euphemia of Sweden

Henry III, Duke of Mecklenburg (c. 1337 – 24 April 1383) was Duke of Mecklenburg from 1379 until his death.

== Life ==
Henry was the first son of Duke Albert II of Mecklenburg and his wife Euphemia of Sweden, the sister of King Magnus IV of Sweden.

Henry III was first married in 1362 to Ingeborg of Denmark, daughter of King Valdemar IV of Denmark. They had four children:

- Albrecht IV, co-regent of Mecklenburg from 1383 to 1388
- Euphemia, married from 1377 to John V of Werle-Güstrow
- Maria of Mecklenburg-Schwerin, mother of Eric of Pomerania, married to Duke Wartislaw VII of Pomerania
- Ingeborg, from 1398 the abbess of the Poor Clares abbey in Ribnitz.

After Ingeborg's death, Henry was married on 26 February 1377 to Matilda of Werle, the daughter of Lord Bernard II of Werle. This marriage remained childless.

After an accident at a tournament in Wismar, Henry III died on 24 April 1383 at his castle in Schwerin and was buried in the Doberan Minster. His brother Magnus I and his son Albert IV took up a brief joint rule of Mecklenburg, which lasted until 1384.

== Sources ==
- Wigger, Friedrich (1885). "Stammtafeln des Großherzoglichen Hauses von Meklenburg". Jahrbücher des Vereins für Mecklenburgische Geschichte und Altertumskunde. 50: 111–326.

Henry III of Mecklenburg House of Mecklenburg Born: c. 1337 Died: 24 April 1383
Preceded by Albert II	Duke of Mecklenburg; 1379–1383	Succeeded by Magnus I
