= Albert IV of Mecklenburg =

Albert IV

Duke of Mecklenburg
- Reign: 1383–1388
- Predecessor: Henry III
- Successor: Albert III & John IV
- Born: before 1363
- Died: between 24 and 31 December 1388
- Spouse: Elisabeth of Holstein
- House: House of Mecklenburg
- Father: Henry III, Duke of Mecklenburg
- Mother: Ingeborg of Denmark

Albert IV (German: Albrecht IV von Mecklenburg; before 1363 - 24/31 December 1388) was Duke of Mecklenburg from 1383 to 1388.

== Life ==
He was the son of the Duke Henry III of Mecklenburg and Ingeborg of Denmark.

Albert was also a claimant to the Danish throne after the death of King Valdemar IV, but Olaf II succeeded instead.

After his father Henry died in 1383, Albert ruled Mecklenburg jointly with his uncles Albert III and Magnus I and his cousin John IV.

He was married to Elisabeth of Holstein, the daughter of Nicholas, Count of Holstein-Rendsburg and died in December 1388. In 1404 his widow Elisabeth married Duke Eric V of Saxe-Lauenburg.
