= Wartislaw VII, Duke of Pomerania =

Duke of Pomerania-Stolp

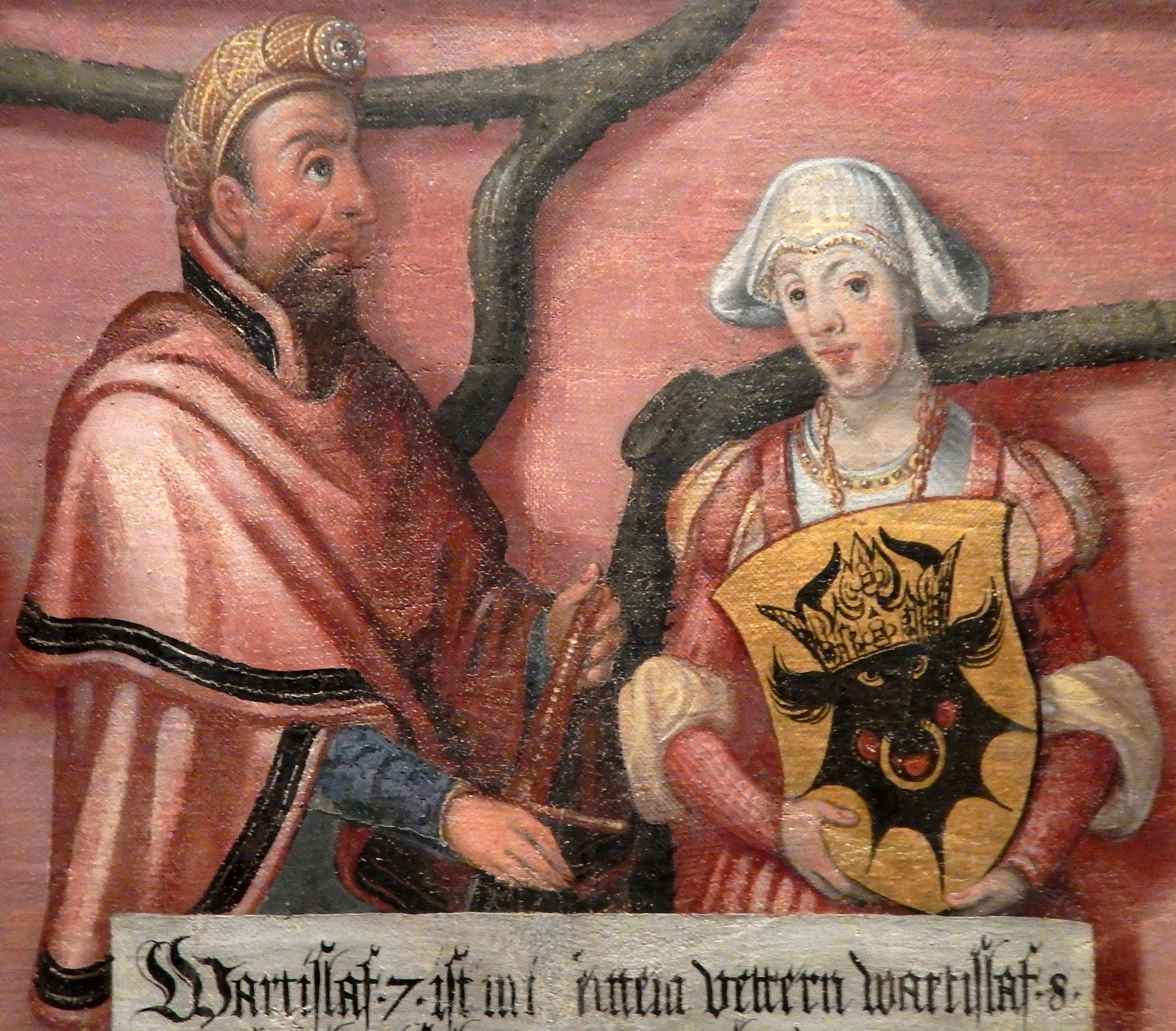
- Wartislaw VII and his wife Maria von Mecklenburg on the picture family tree of the griffins by Cornelius Krommeny (1598)
- Born: c. 1363–1365
- Died: c. 1394–1395
- Noble family: House of Griffin
- Spouse: Maria of Mecklenburg-Schwerin
- Issue: Eric of Pomerania; Catherine of Pomerania
- Father: Bogislaw V, Duke of Pomerania
- Mother: Adelheid of Brunswick-Grubenhagen

Wartislaw VII (Polish: Warcisław VII) (1363/1365 – 1394/1395) was one of the Dukes of Pomerania. His full name was Henry Wartislaw.

== Life ==
He was the son of Bogislaw V, brother of Casimir IV and Bogislaw VIII. He married Maria of Mecklenburg-Schwerin (daughter of Henry III, Duke of Mecklenburg) and was the father of Eric of Pomerania and Catherine of Pomerania.

In 1377, he became a duke of Pomerania, ruling in Pomerania-Stolp; at times he was its co-ruler with his brother, Bogislaw VIII. He maneuvered between two local powers, the Teutonic Knights and the Kingdom of Poland. In 1386 he allied himself with the Knights; but in 1390, by the Treaty of Pyzdry, he allied himself with Poland, and pledged vassalage to the king of Poland, Władysław Jagiełło. In return, he received the territory of Nakło from the Polish king.

In 1392–1393, he went on a pilgrimage to the Holy Land. According to some sources, the pilgrimage started already in 1391, yet he is also reported to have stayed in Vordingborg in July 1392. On 1 August 1392, Wartislaw, his brother Bogislaw VIII and some clergy of the Bishopric of Cammin met with Johann, the bishop of Lebus, and Johann of Görlitz, a prince of the Margraviate of Brandenburg, in Brandenburgian Landsberg an der Warthe (now Gorzów). Bogislaw returned to Pomerania, and Wartislaw travelled southwards to meet with Wartislaw VIII, Duke of Pomerania who ruled Pomerania-Wolgast. Both Wartislaws then travelled through Hungary. In Smederevo, (Note: Smederevo, also Semengrin or Senderow, in primary sources also spelled Zeuderin, Zenderin, Zuderin, Zanderini, Senendria, Senderin. Zdrenka (1995), p.12.) a town southeast of Belgrad (then part of Hungary, now part of Serbia) Wartislaw VII fell ill, and in 1393 returned to Pomerania while Wartislaw VIII continued the pilgrimage alone.

During Wartislaw VII's absence, the Pomeranian noble Matzke von Borcke auf Stramehl had led a holdup in Pomerania-Stolp, where Bohemian komtur Johann von Mühlheim was robbed on his way to the Teutonic Order state in late 1392. Konrad von Wallenrode, Grand Master of the Teutonic Knights, protested at Wartislaw VII's and Bogislaw VIII's court and demanded satisfaction. Wartislaw and Bogislaw then granted him permission to destroy Matzke's residence Stramehl, which eventually was razed.

Wartislaw died between November 1394 and 23 February 1395.

== See also ==
- List of Pomeranian duchies and dukes
- Pomerania during the Late Middle Ages

== Notes ==
Wartislaw VII, Duke of Pomerania House of Griffins Born: c. 1363-1365 Died: c. 1394-1395
Preceded by Casimir IV	Duke of Pomerania-Stolp; 1377–1395	Succeeded by Bogislaw VIII
