= Erik of Pomerania =

King of Denmark, Norway and Sweden (1381/1382–1459)

Erik
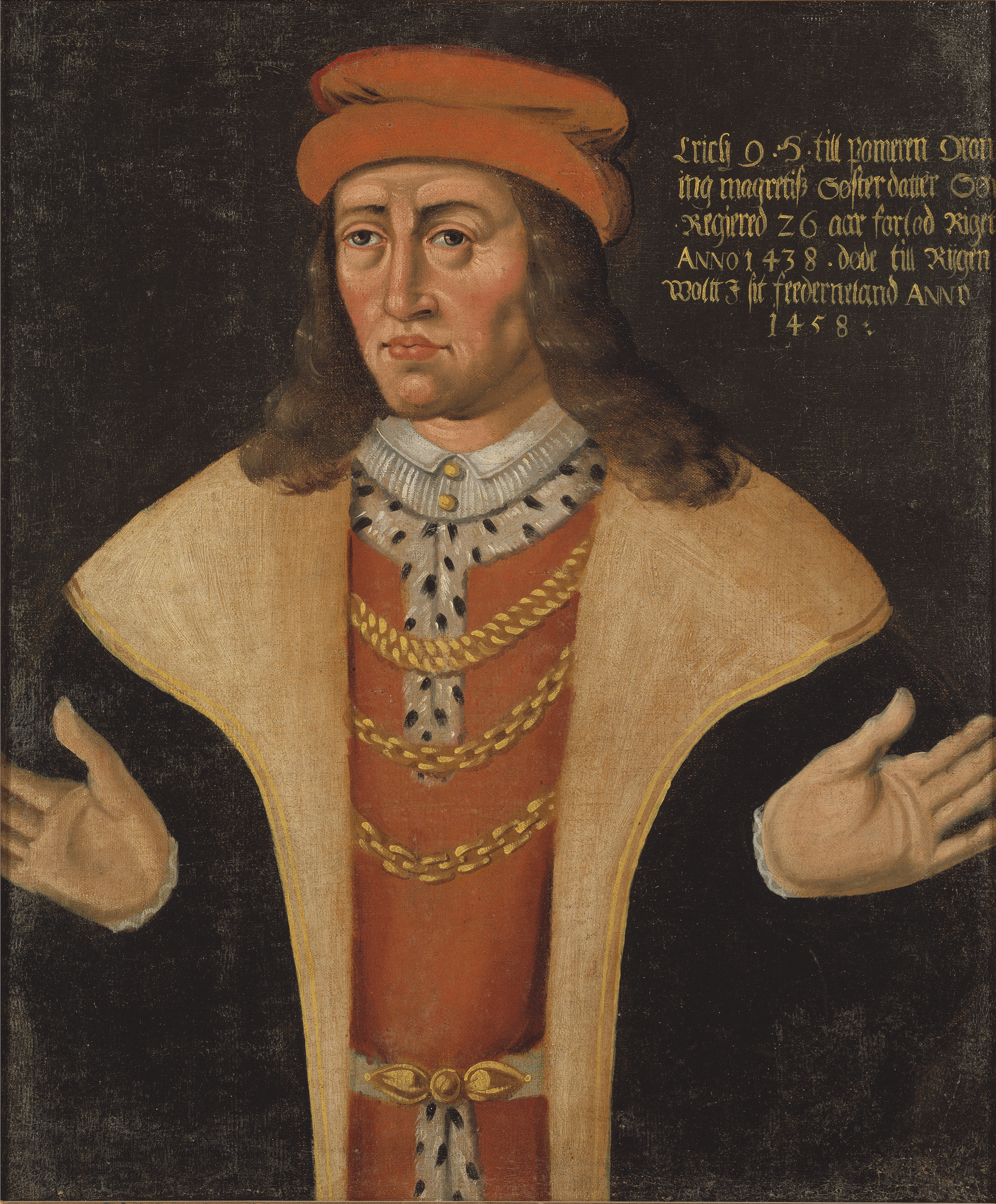
- Portrait by an unknown artist, Nationalmuseum

King of Denmark and Sweden
- Reign: 1396 (de jure) or 28 October 1412 (de facto) – 24 September 1439
- Coronation: 17 June 1397, Storkyrkan, Kalmar, Sweden
- Predecessor: Margaret I
- Successor: Christopher III
- Regent and co-sovereign: Margaret I (until 1412)

King of Norway
- Reign: 8 September 1389 – 4 June 1442
- Coronation: 1392, Oslo Cathedral
- Predecessor: Margaret
- Successor: Christopher
- Regent and co-sovereign: Margaret (until 1412)
- Regent: Sigurd Jonsson (1439–1442)

Ruler of Gotland
- Reign: 8 September 1439 – 4 June 1449

Duke of Pomerania
- Reign: 1449 – 1459
- Predecessor: Bogislav IX
- Successor: Sophie I
- Regent: Maria of Masovia (1446–1449)
- Born: Bogislaw; 1381 or 1382; Darłowo Castle, Pomerania
- Died: 24 September 1459 (aged 76–78); Darłowo Castle, Pomerania
- Burial: St. Mary's Church, Darłowo, Poland
- Spouses: Philippa of England (m. 1406; died 1430) Cecilia (morganatic)
- House: Griffin (by birth); Estridsen (by adoption)
- Father: Wartislaw VII, Duke of Pomerania
- Mother: Maria of Mecklenburg-Schwerin

Erik of Pomerania (Note: Norwegian and Swedish: Erik av Pommern, Danish: Erik af Pommern, German: Erich von Pommern, Polish: Eryk Pomorski) (c. 1381/1382 – 24 September 1459) ruled over the Kalmar Union from 1396 until 1439. He was initially co-ruler with his great-aunt Margaret I until her death in 1412. Erik is known as Erik III as King of Norway (1389–1442), Erik VII as King of Denmark (1396–1439) and has been called Erik XIII (Note: Referring to Erik of Pomerania as King Erik XIII of Sweden—as on an 18th-century monument in Landskrona stating that the town was founded by King Erik XIII in 1413—is a later invention, counting backwards from Erik XIV (1560–68), who adopted his numeral according to a fictitious history of Sweden. It is not known how many historical Swedish monarchs were named Erik before this one (at least six were).) as King of Sweden (1396–1434, 1436–39). Erik was ultimately deposed from all three kingdoms of the union, but in 1449 he inherited one of the partitions of the Duchy of Pomerania and ruled it as duke until his death in 1459. His epithet of Pomerania was a pejorative intended to insinuate that he did not belong in Scandinavia.

== Succession background ==
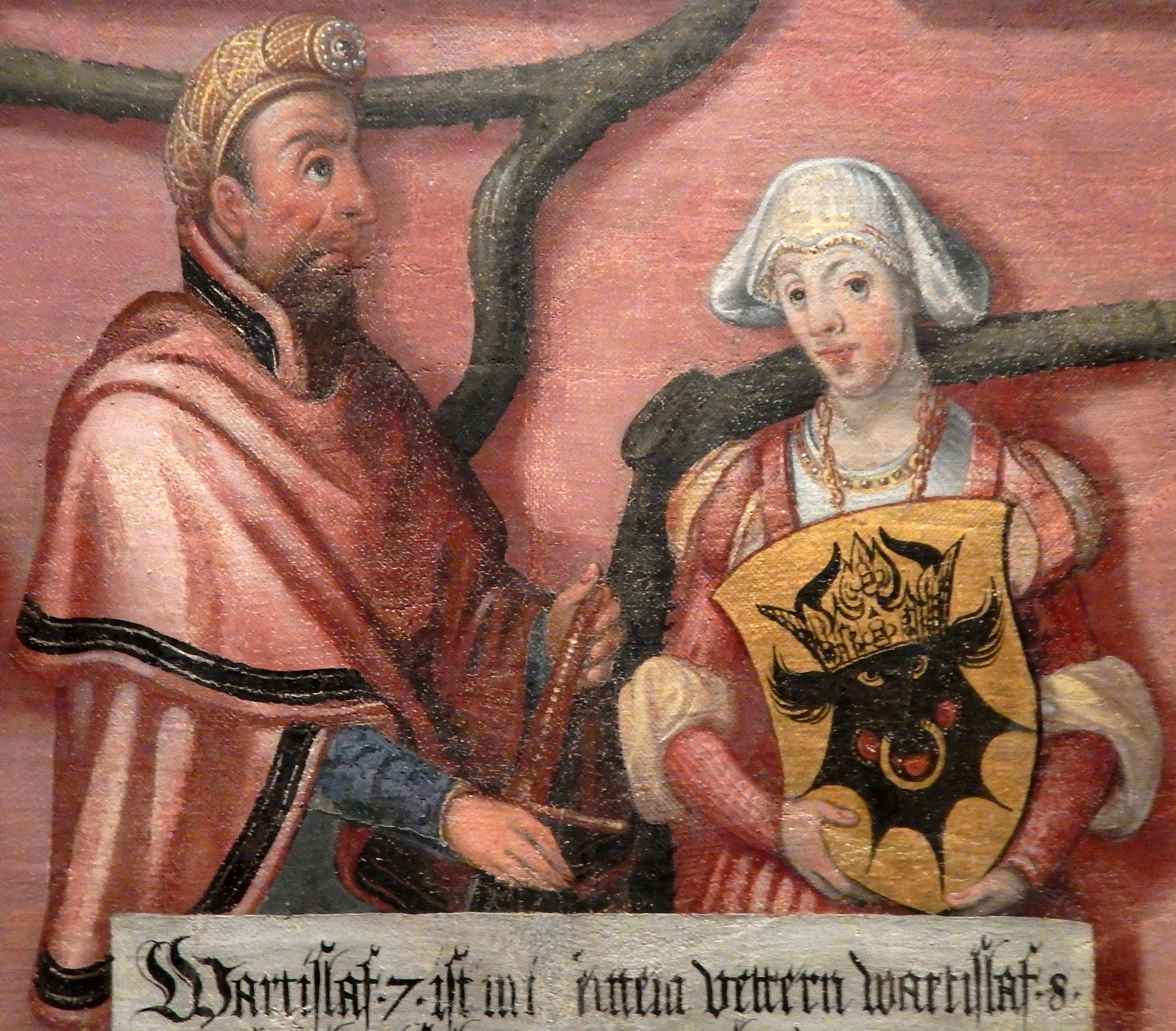
Erik's parents, Duke Wartislaw and Duchess Maria

Erik was born in either 1381 or 1382 in Darłowo (formerly Rügenwalde), Pomerania, Poland. Named Bogusław (Bogislaw) at birth, he was the son of Wartislaw VII, Duke of Pomerania, and Maria of Mecklenburg-Schwerin.

Bogislaw's great-aunt Margaret I, who ruled the kingdoms of Denmark, Norway, and Sweden, wanted her realm to be unified and peaceful, and so made provisions in the event of her death. She chose Bogislaw as her heir and successor.

In 1389, Bogislaw was brought to Denmark to be raised by Queen Margaret. His name was changed to the more Nordic-sounding Erik. On 8 September 1389, he was hailed as King of Norway at the Ting in Trondheim. He may have been crowned King of Norway in Oslo in 1392, but this is disputed.

Erik's father Wartislaw died between November 1394 and 23 February 1395. When Wartislaw died, his thrones were all attained by Erik as the heir.

In 1396, Erik was proclaimed as king in Denmark and then in Sweden. On 17 June 1397, he was crowned king of the three Nordic countries in the cathedral of Kalmar. At the same time, a union treaty was drafted, declaring the establishment of what has become known as the Kalmar Union. Queen Margaret, however, remained the de facto ruler of the three kingdoms until her death in 1412.

== Marriage ==
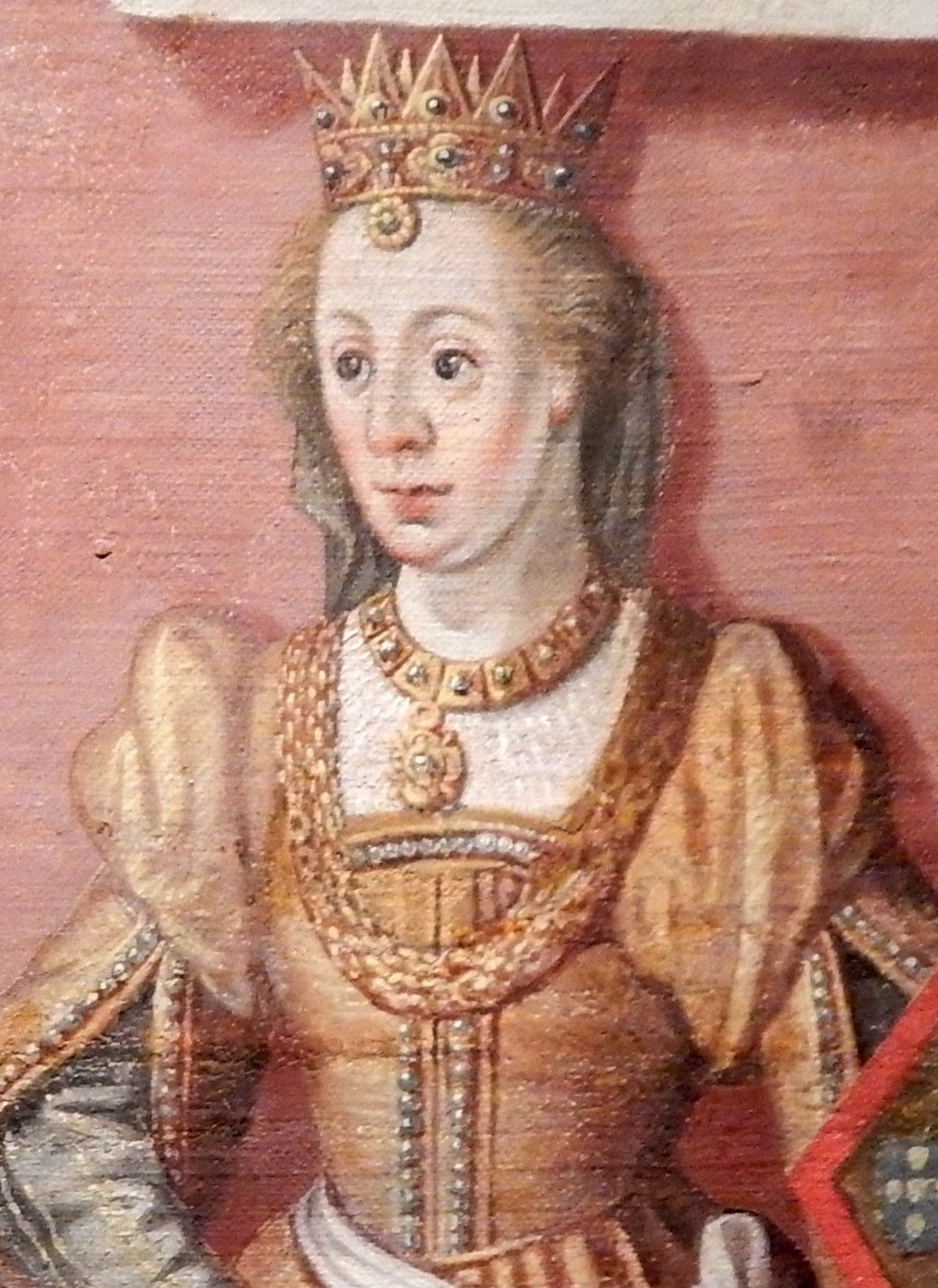
Queen Philippa

In 1402, Queen Margaret entered into negotiations with King Henry IV of England about the possibility of an alliance between the Kingdom of England and the Nordic union. The proposal was for a double wedding, whereby, King Erik would marry King Henry's second daughter, Philippa of England, and Henry IV's heir Henry, Prince of Wales, would marry Erik's sister, Catherine of Pomerania (c. 1390–1426).

The double wedding did not come off, but Erik's wedding to Philippa of England was successfully negotiated. On 26 October 1406, he married the 12-year-old Philippa in Lund. The wedding was accompanied by a purely defensive alliance with England. After Philippa's death later in 1430, Erik replaced her with her former lady-in-waiting, Cecilia, who became his royal mistress and later his morganatic spouse. The relationship was a public scandal and is mentioned in the royal council's official complaints about the King.

== Reign ==
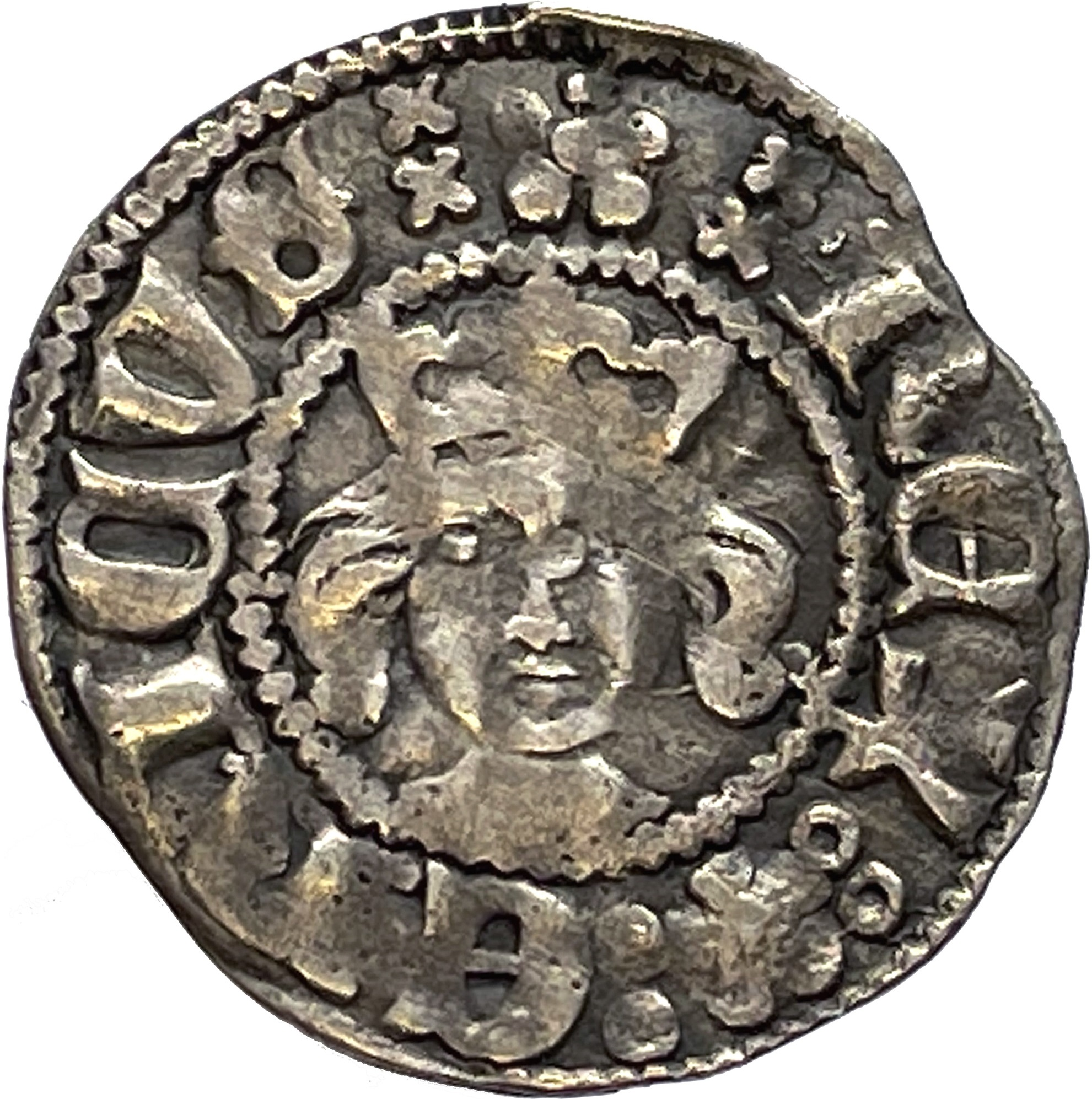
One of King Erik's coins

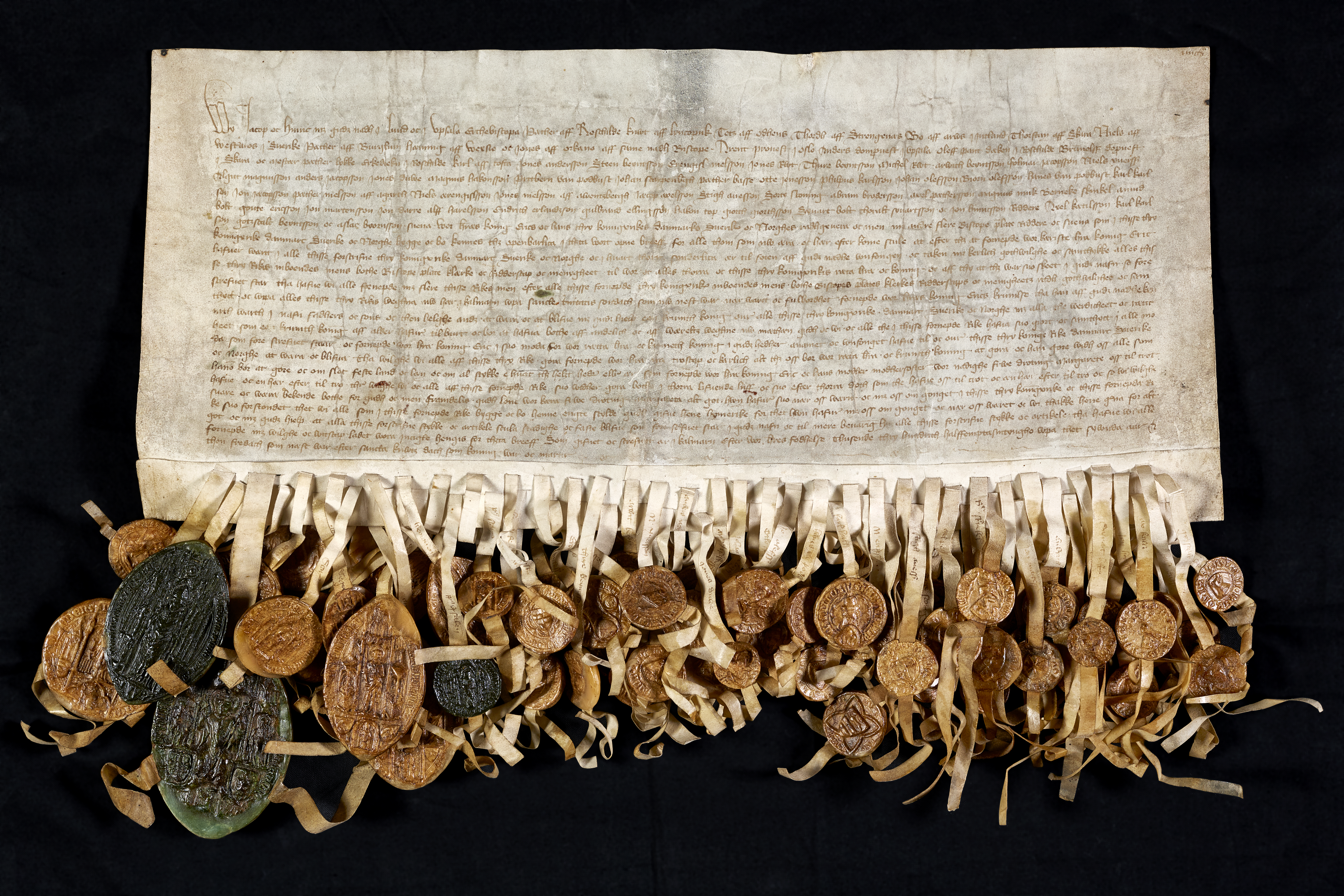
Erik's coronation letter

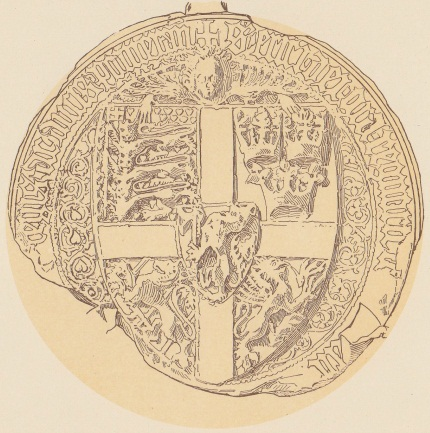
Royal seal of Erik of Pomerania (1398) depicting: (Centre): a lion rampant crowned maintaining an axe (representing Norway) within an inescutcheon upon a cross over all; Quarterly: in Dexter Chief, three lions passant in pale crowned and maintaining a Danebrog upon a semy of hearts (representing Denmark); in Sinister Chief: three crowns (representing Sweden or the Kalmar Union); in Dexter Base: a lion rampant (Folkung lion) (representing Sweden); and in Sinister Base: a griffin segreant to sinister (representing Pomerania).

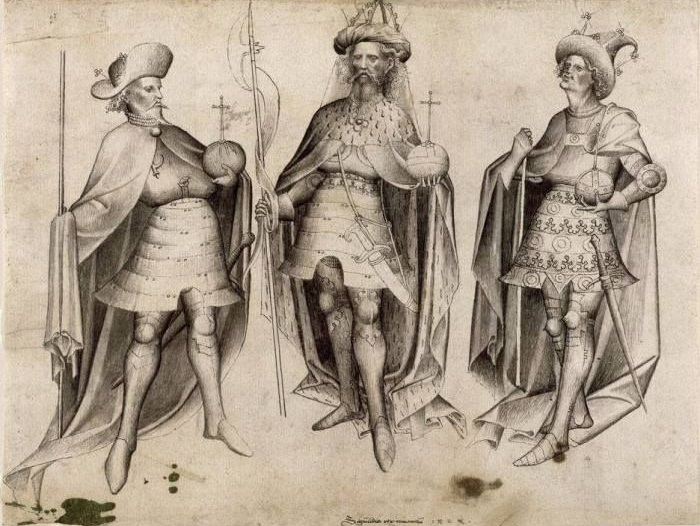
Depicted in 1424 as apparently of equal rank, King Erik (right) met with Emperors John VIII Palaiologos and Sigismund in Buda

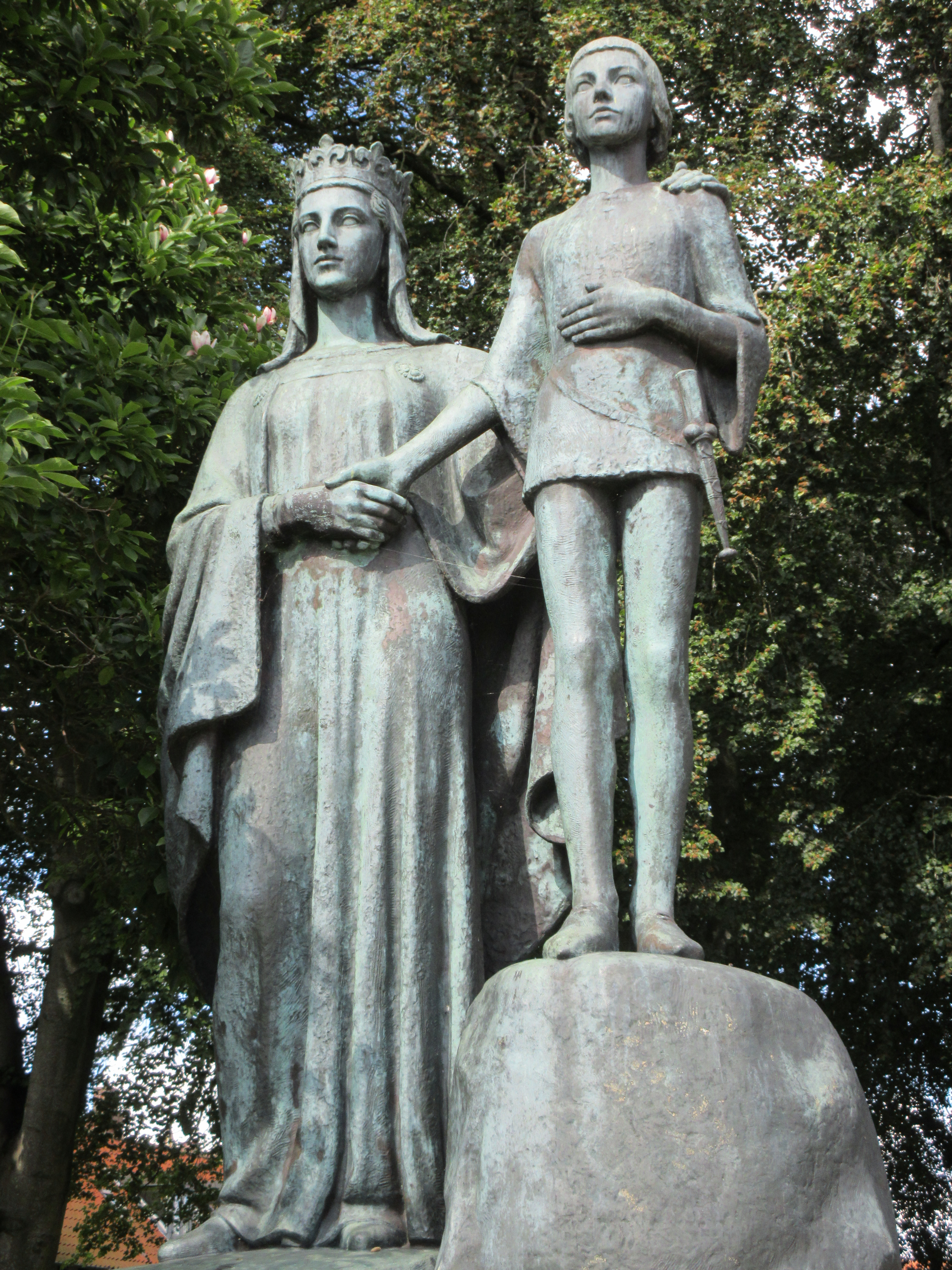
Statue of Erik with Queen Margaret in Viborg, Denmark

During the early period of his reign, King Erik made Copenhagen a royal possession in 1417, thereby assuring its status as the capital of Denmark. He also usurped the rights of Copenhagen Castle from the Bishop of Roskilde, and from then on, the castle was occupied by him.

From contemporary sources, Erik appears as intelligent, visionary, energetic, and a firm character. That he was also a charming and well-spoken man of the world was shown by his great European tour of the 1420s. Negatively, he seems to have had a hot temper, a lack of diplomatic sense, and an obstinacy that bordered on mulishness. Erik was described by the future Pope Pius II as having "a beautiful body, reddish yellow hair, a ruddy face, and a long narrow neck … alone, without assistance, and without touching the stirrups, he jumped upon a horse, and all women were drawn to him, especially the Empress, in a feeling of longing for love".

From 1423 until May 1425, Erik went on a pilgrimage to Jerusalem. After arriving there, he was dubbed Knight of the Holy Sepulchre by the Franciscan Custos of the Holy Land, and subsequently himself dubbed his pilgrim fellows, among them, Ivan Anz Frankopan. During his absence, Queen Philippa served as regent of the three kingdoms from Copenhagen.

Almost the whole of Erik's sole rule was affected by his long-standing conflict with the Counts of Schauenburg and Holstein. He tried to regain South Jutland (Schleswig) which Queen Margaret had been winning, but he chose a policy of warfare instead of negotiations. The result was a devastating war that not only ended without conquests, but also led to the loss of the South Jutlandic areas that he had already obtained. During this war, he showed much energy and steadiness, but also a remarkable lack of adroitness. In 1424, a verdict of the Holy Roman Empire by Sigismund, King of Germany, recognising Erik as the legal ruler of South Jutland, was ignored by the Holsteiners. The long war was a strain on the Danish economy as well as on the unity of the north.

Perhaps Erik's most far-ranging act was the introduction of the Sound Dues (Øresundtolden) in 1429, which was to last until 1857. It consisted of the payment of sound dues by all ships wishing to enter or leave the Baltic Sea passing through the Sound. To help enforce his demands, Erik built Krogen, a powerful fortress at the narrowest point in the Sound, in the early 1400s. This resulted in the control of all navigation through the Sound, and thus secured a large stable income for his kingdom that made it relatively rich, and which made the town of Elsinore flower. It showed his interest in Danish trade and naval power, but also permanently challenged the other Baltic powers, especially the Hanseatic cities against which he also fought. From 1426 to 1435, he was at war with the German Hanseatic League and Holstein. When the Hanseats and Holsteiners attacked Copenhagen in 1428, King Erik was absent from the city at Sorø Abbey and did not return, so Queen Philippa managed the defense of the capital.

During the 1430s, the King's policy fell apart. In 1434, the farmers and mine workers of Sweden began a national and social rebellion which was soon used by the Swedish nobility in order to weaken the power of the King. The Engelbrekt rebellion (1434–1436) was led by Swedish nobleman Engelbrekt Engelbrektsson (c. 1390 – 4 May 1436). The Swedes had been affected by the war with the Hanseatic League (1426–35) which affected trade and disturbed Swedish exports with Schleswig, Holstein, Mecklenburg, and Pomerania. The rebellion caused erosion within the unity of the Kalmar Union, leading to the temporary expulsion of Danish forces from Sweden. In Norway, a subsequent rebellion in 1436 was led by Amund Sigurdsson Bolt (1400–1465). It resulted in a siege of Oslo and Akershus Castle but ended in a ceasefire. In 1438 a new rebellion led by Hallvard Graatop erupted, in Eastern Norway, but this rebellion was also put down.

Erik had to yield to the demands of both the Holsteiners and the Hanseatic League. On 17 July 1435, he signed the Peace of Vordingborg with the Hanseatic League and Holstein. Under the terms of the peace agreement, Hanseatic cities were excepted from the Sound Dues and the Duchy of Schleswig was ceded to the count of Holstein.

== Coup d'état ==
When the Danish nobility subsequently opposed his rule and refused to ratify his choice of Bogislaw IX, Duke of Pomerania as the next king of Denmark, Erik left Denmark in response and took up permanent residence at Visborg Castle in Gotland, which led to his deposition through coup d'état by the National Councils of Denmark and Sweden in 1439.

In 1440, Erik was succeeded by his nephew Christopher of Bavaria, who was chosen for the thrones of both Denmark and Sweden. Initially the Norwegian Riksråd remained loyal to Erik and wanted him to remain king of Norway. In September 1439, Erik had given Sigurd Jonsson the title of drottsete, under which he was to rule Norway in the King's name. But with the King isolated in Gotland, the Norwegian nobility also felt compelled to depose Erik through a coup d'état in 1440, and he was formally deposed in 1442, when Sigurd Jonsson stepped down as drottsete, and Christopher was elected king.

At the death of King Christopher in 1448, the next monarch was Erik's kinsman, Christian of Oldenburg (the son of Erik's earlier rival, Count Theodoric of Oldenburg), who succeeded to the throne of Denmark, while Karl Knutsson Bonde succeeded to the throne of Sweden. A rivalry ensued between Karl and Christian for the throne of Norway. In 1450, Karl was forced to relinquish the throne of Norway in favour of King Christian.

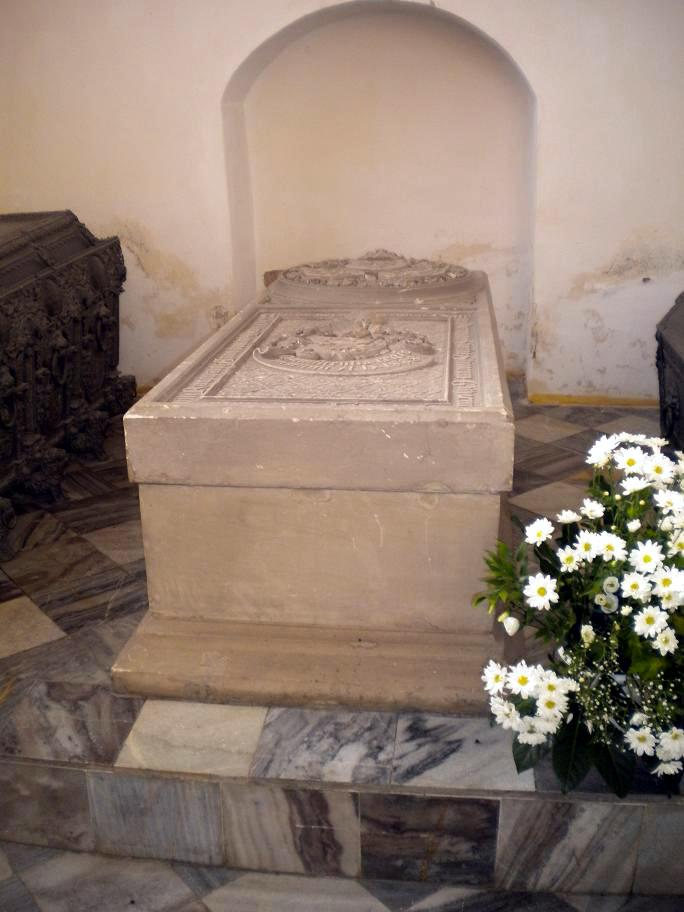
Erik's grave at St. Mary's in Darłowo

== Duke of Pomerania ==
For ten years, Erik lived in Gotland where he fought against the merchant trade in the Baltic. From 1449 to 1459, Erik succeeded Bogislaw IX as Duke of Pomerania and ruled Pomerania-Rügenwalde, a small partition of the Duchy of Pomerania-Stolp (Polish: Księstwo Słupskie), as "Erik I". He died in 1459 at Darłowo Castle (German: Schloss Rügenwalde), and was buried in the Church of St. Mary's at Darłowo in Pomerania.

The Burgermeister of Kiel to King Christian III of Denmark wrote that Erik encouraged a joint expedition by Didrik Pining and Hans Pothorst to investigate the Northwest Passage. Their voyage after Erik's death is alleged to have reached Greenland and engaged in combat with the Inuit.

== Titles and styles ==
Erik's full title was: "King of Denmark, Sweden and Norway, the Wends and the Goths, Duke of Pomerania".

== Family tree ==
Valdemar IV of Denmark
Bogislaw V of Pomerania	Ingeborg of Denmark	Margaret I of Denmark
Bogislaw VIII of Pomerania	Wartislaw VII of Pomerania	Maria of Mecklenburg-Schwerin
Bogislaw IX of Pomerania	Catherine of Pomerania	Erik of Pomerania
Christopher of Bavaria (King of Denmark)

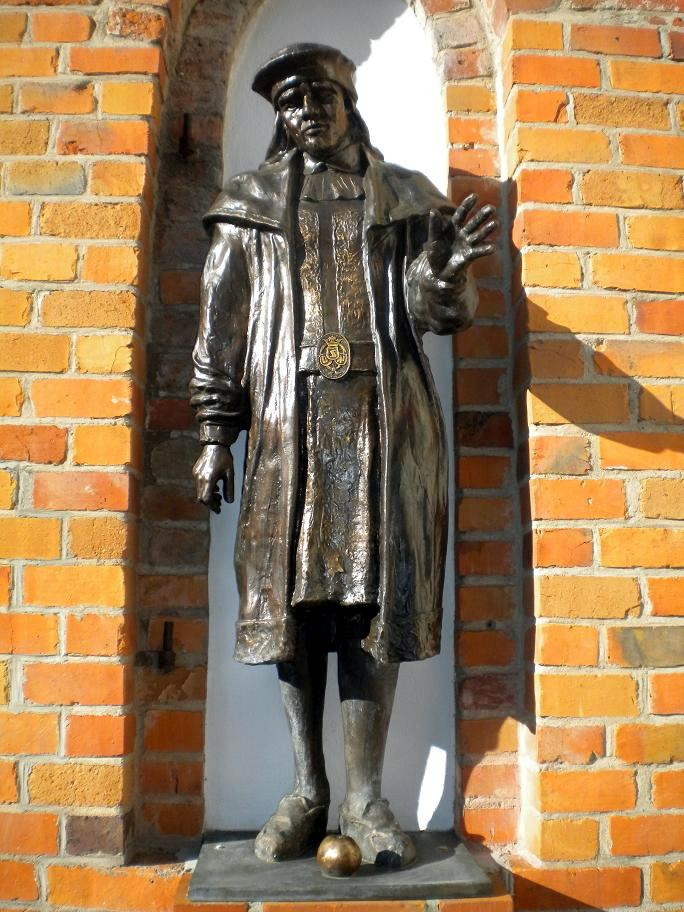
Statue of Erik at Darłowo Castle

== Other sources ==
- Albrectsen, Esben (1997) Fællesskabet bliver til : 1380–1536 (Oslo : Universitetsforl.) ISBN 82-00-22790-1
- Christensen, Aksel E. (1908) Kalmarunionen og nordisk politik 1319–1439 (Oslo: Gyldendal) ISBN 87-00-51833-6
- Haug, Eldbjørg (2000), Margrete – den siste dronning i Sverreætten (Oslo: Cappelen) ISBN 82-02-17642-5
- Haug, Eldbjørg (2006) Provincia Nidrosiensis i dronning Margretes unions- og maktpolitikk (Trondheim : Institutt for historie og klassiske fag) ISBN 9788277650470
- Larsson, Lars-Olof (2003) Kalmarunionens tid (Stockholm: Prisma) ISBN 91-518-4217-3

Erik of Pomerania House of Griffins Born: 1381 or 1382 Died: 3 May 1459
Regnal titles
Preceded by Margaret I	King of Norway; 1389–1442 with Margaret I (1389–1412)	Succeeded by Christopher (III)
Preceded by Margaret I	King of Denmark; 1396–1439 with Margaret I (1396–1412)	Succeeded by Christopher (III)
Preceded by Margaret I	King of Sweden; 1396–1434 with Margaret I (1396–1412)	Vacant
Vacant	King of Sweden; 1435–1436	Vacant Regency of Karl Knutsson
Vacant Regency of Karl Knutsson	King of Sweden; 1436–1439	Vacant Regency of Karl Knutsson Title next held by Christopher
Preceded by Bogislaw IX	Duke of Pomerania-Stolp; 1446–1459	Succeeded by Eric II
