= Spitzer Manuscript =

Oldest known or surviving philosophical manuscript in Sanskrit

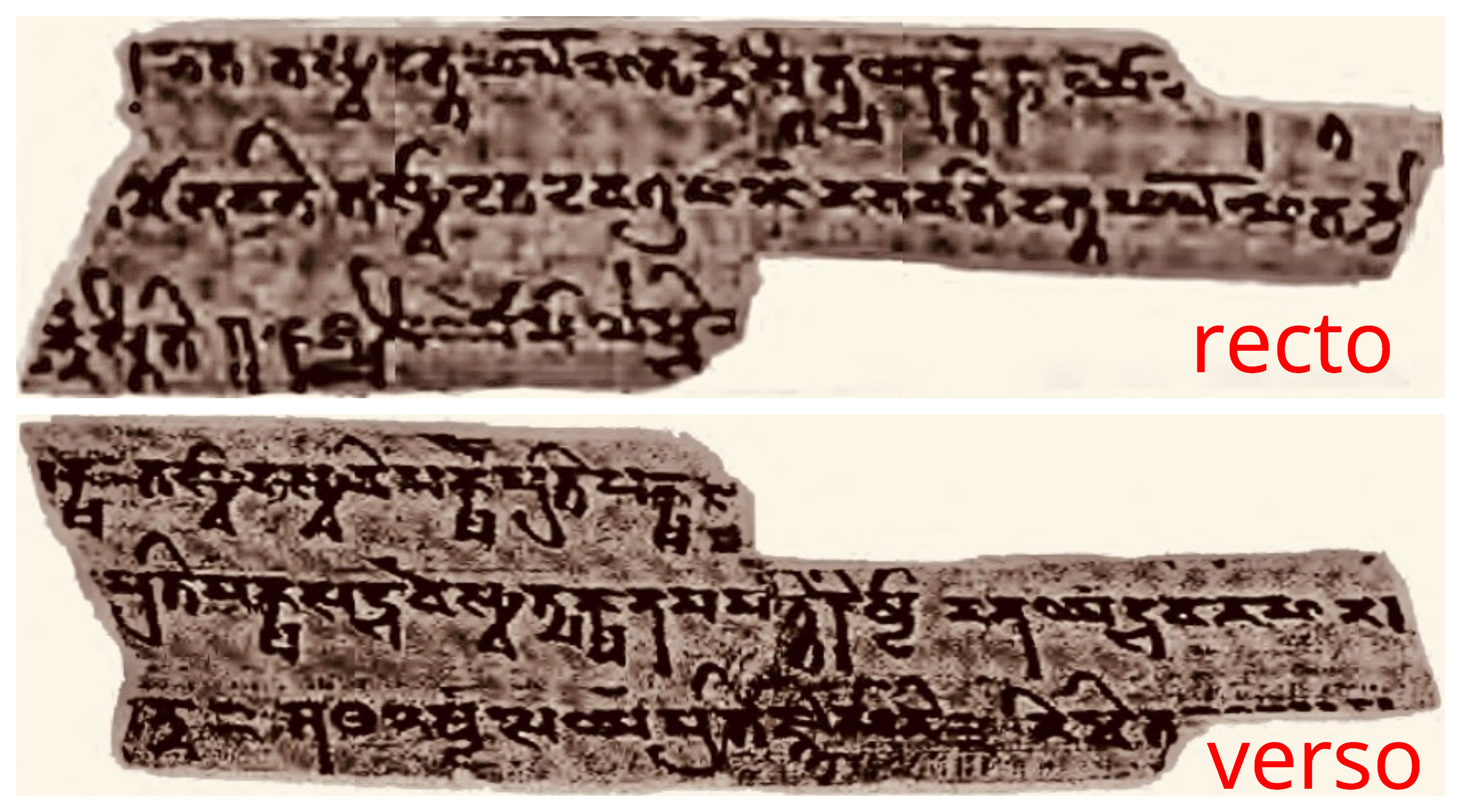
Spitzer Manuscript folio 383 fragment. This Sanskrit text was written on both sides of the palm leaf (recto and verso).

The Spitzer Manuscript is the oldest surviving philosophical manuscript in Sanskrit, and possibly the oldest discovered Sanskritic manuscript of any type related to Hinduism and Buddhism. (Note: The Spitzer Manuscript – consisting of a collection of treatises – is not the oldest known manuscript of ancient India, however. The oldest known Indian – and the oldest known Buddhist and Hindu manuscripts in the world – so far are dated between 500 BCE and 300 BCE. These were discovered in the caves of eastern Afghanistan (ancient Gandhara) in the early 1990s and are in Gandhari language. The collection includes birch bark scrolls and palm-leaf manuscripts. Acquired by the British Library since 1994, they have been studied by groups in Japan, Germany and the USA (led by Richard Salomon). More have been acquired in the 2000s and 2010s, with some pothis (manuscripts) now a part of the Schøyen Collection and the Robert Senior Collection.) The manuscript was found in 1906 in the form of a pile of more than 1,000 palm leaf fragments in the Ming-oi, Kizil Caves, China, during the third Turfan expedition headed by Albert Grünwedel. It is named after Moritz Spitzer, whose team first studied it in 1927–28.

The calibrated age by Carbon-14 technique is 130 CE (80–230 CE). According to Indologist Eli Franco, palaeographical features suggest a date closer to 200–230 CE. The text is written in the Brahmi script (Kushana period) and some early Gupta script.

The Spitzer Manuscript was found near the northern branch of the Central Asian Silk Road. It is unique in a number of ways. Unlike numerous Indian manuscripts whose copies survive as early translations in Tibet and China, no such translations of the treatises within the Spitzer Manuscript have been found so far. The manuscript fragments are actually copies of a collection of older Hindu treatises. Sections of Buddhist treatises constitute the largest part of the Spitzer Manuscript. They include verses on a number of Buddhist philosophies and a debate on the nature of Dukkha and the Four Noble Truths. The Hindu portions include treatises from the Nyaya-Vaiśeṣika, Tarkasatra (treatise on rhetoric and proper means to debate) and one of the earliest dateable table of content sequentially listing the parva (books) of the Mahabharata, along with numerals after each parva. This list does not include Anusasanaparvan and Virataparvan. Studies by the Indologist Dieter Schlingloff on these Spitzer Manuscript fragments suggest that more ancient versions of the Mahabharata were likely expanded and interpolated in the early centuries of the common era. According to Indologist and Sanskrit scholar John Brockington, known for his Mahabharata-related publications, the table of contents in the Spitzer Manuscript includes book names not found in later versions, and it is possible that the parvas existed but were with different titles. The epic known to the scribe of Spitzer Manuscript may have been in the form of a different arrangement and titles. (Note: According to Brockington, "the evidence of the list found in the Spitzer manuscript is thus in my view not only compatible with but also valuable evidence, albeit incomplete evidence, for the shape of the text at the earliest date for which we have any testimony.") The final portion of the Spitzer Manuscript is devoted to dialectics. However, this is not the expanded and redacted version from the Gupta period that we have in the critical edition. Instead, it is an earlier version known as Bhārata text, which has not survived.

In addition to the Mahabharata, the Spitzer Manuscript refers to or includes sections from the Arthashastra and the Manusmriti (juridical chapters) – a tradition of collecting Hindu texts that is found in ancient Buddhist monasteries' collections such as the Kharosthi-script manuscripts of the Bajaur Collection discovered in Buddhist ruins of Afghanistan and northwest Pakistan since the 1990s, states Harry Falk and Ingo Strauch.

The decayed Spitzer Manuscript does not survive in the form it was discovered in 1906, and portions of it were likely destroyed during World War II. Of what survives, predominant portions are now at the Staatsbibliothek zu Berlin (Berlin State Library) in Germany and cataloged as SHT 810. Some surviving fragments are now at the British Library, and are cataloged as Or 15005/6–8, Or 15005/17–21 and Or 15005/30–32.

== See also ==
- Bower Manuscript
- Weber Manuscript
- Gandhāran Buddhist texts
