= Rhanerbräu =

Brewery in Schöntal-Rhan, Bavaria, Germany

Rhanerbräu GmbH & Co. KG
- Location: Rhan 9, Schönthal-Rhan, Cham, Bavaria, Germany
- Coordinates: 49°20′10″N 12°37′03″E
- Opened: 1283
- Key people: Dr. Alois Plößl
- Website: rhaner.de

Rhanerbräu is one of the five oldest German breweries with continuous beer production located in Schönthal-Rhan, Cham district in Bavaria federal state. First mentioned in 1283, it is managed by the Bruckmayer family since 1776.

In the spring of 2009, the heat supply of the entire brewery was converted to regenerative energy source. In the "Rhaner Bierkist'l", a building in the form of the world's largest beer cell, a directional biomass heating center is being built that provides process heat in the form of high-pressure steam CO_{2}-neutral for all operating parts.

== See also ==
- List of oldest companies
