= Frank W. Ikle =

Swiss-American historian

Frank William Ikle (1921–2015) was a Swiss-American historian and history educator. He was professor of history at the University of New Mexico.

== About ==
Born in Zürich, Switzerland, to Martin W. Ikle and Helen Prichystal, Ikle studied Asian Studies and History at the University of California at Berkeley, earning his BA in 1941 and PhD in 1953. In 1944 he married Maurine Barnes, with whom he had three children.

== Career ==
Ikle served in the United States Naval Reserve Pacific Fleet as Lt. Commander and Japanese language officer in naval intelligence from 1942 to 1946. He then taught in the United States: at Reed College (1950–1954); Harvard University (Carnegie Fellow, 1951–1952); Fulbright lecturer, University of the Philippines (1955–1956); Miami University of Ohio (1957–1963). In 1963 be took the position of Professor of History at the University of New Mexico (he was Professor of the Year, 1969), and was visiting professor at the University of Zurich (1962) and University of Hong Kong (1975). He was a member of the American Historical Association, the Association of Asian Studies, the American Association of University Professors. He also served on the New Mexico Humanities Council Bicentennial Commission.

He contributed to Japan's Foreign Policy, 1868-1941: A Research Guide by James W. Morley and The spiritual expansion of medieval Latin Christendom. The Asian missions by James D. Ryan.

== Publications ==
- German-Japanese Relations 1936–1940 (New York: Bookman, 1956).
- Japanese-German peace negotiations during World War I (Washington: American Historical Association, 1965)
- "The conversion of the Alani by the Franciscan missionaries in China in the fourteenth century", ASJ 5:2 (1967)
- "Sir Aurel Stein : a Victorian geographer in the tracks of Alexander", Isis, vol. 59 (1968), pp. 144–55.
- (with Woodbridge Bingham and Hilary Conroy) Southwest Asia : a brief history (Berkeley, CA, 1956)
- (with Woodbridge Bingham and Hilary Conroy), A History of Asia: Old empires, Western penetration, and the rise of new nations since 1600 (Boston: Allyn and Bacon, 1974)
