= Schönthal Priory =

Former monastery of Augustinian Hermits

Schönthal Priory (Kloster Schönthal) is a former monastery of the Augustinian Hermits in Schönthal in Bavaria, Germany.

The priory, dedicated to the Blessed Virgin Mary and Saint Michael, was a Williamite monastery from about 1250 to 1263. From 1263 onwards it served as a monastery of the Augustinian Hermits. It was secularised in 1802, when the friars were sent off to Munich, the monastery estates sold off and the monastic buildings, brewery and pharmacy auctioned. The former monastery church burnt down in 1833, but was later rebuilt, and extensively restored in 1989.

== Sources ==
- (in German) Klöster in Bayern: Schönthal
