= Islam Akhun =

19th- to 20th-century Uyghur con artist

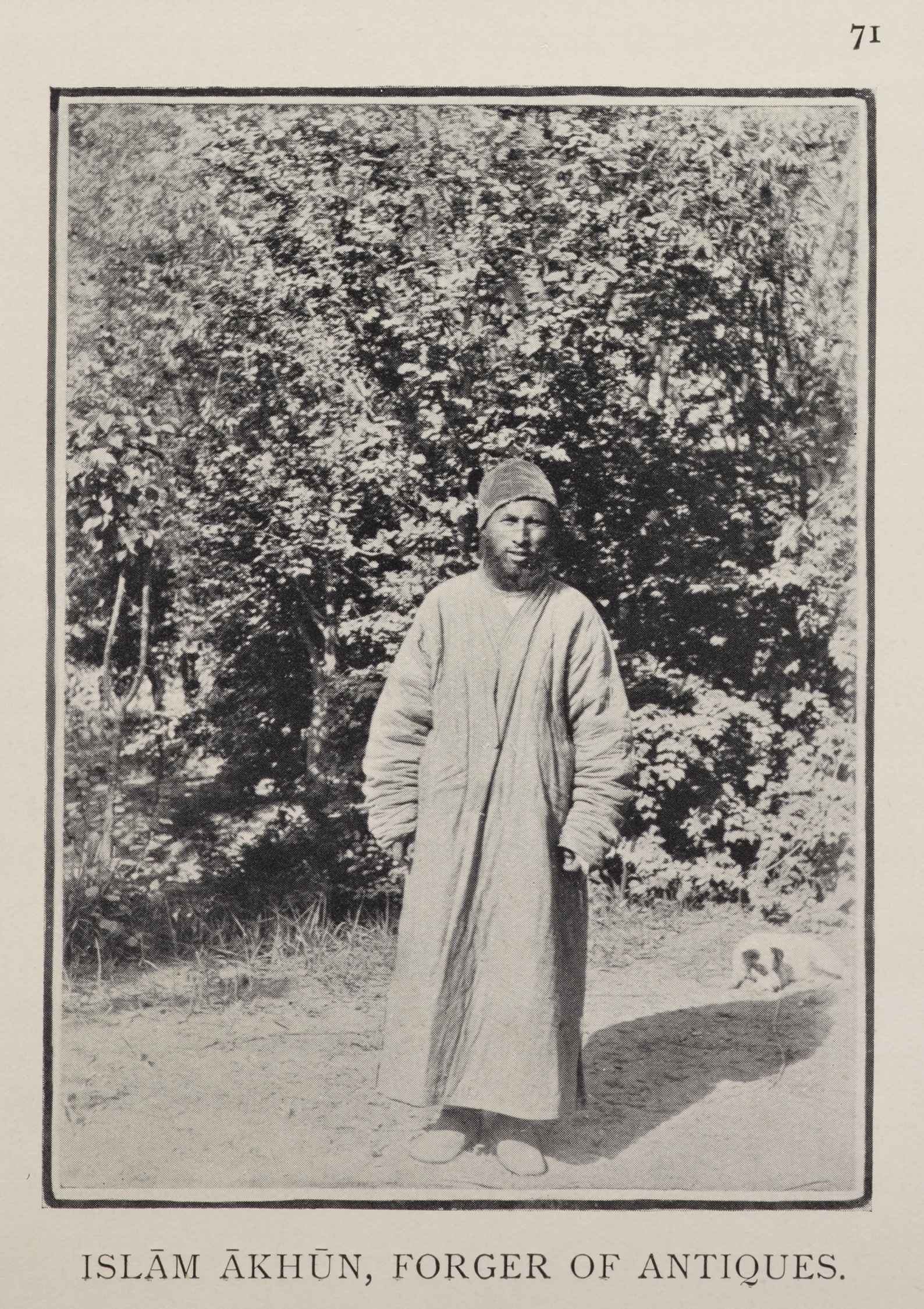
Islam Akhun in Aurel Stein's Ancient Khotan (1907), as photographed by Stein 1901

Islam Akhun (Uyghur: ئىسلام ئاخۇن) was a Uyghur con artist from Khotan who forged numerous manuscripts and printed documents and sold them as ancient Silk Road manuscripts. Since the accidental discovery of the Bower Manuscript in 1889 such texts had become much sought after. The imperial powers of the time – Britain, France, Germany, Russia and Japan – sponsored archaeological expeditions to Central Asia.

== The forgeries ==
It was in this competitive environment that Islam Akhun emerged. In 1895 he approached the British consul in Kashgar, Sir George Macartney, with a number of manuscripts on paper. Some were in a script similar to Brahmi and the documents were in several different formats, many bound with copper ties. Macartney purchased the documents and sent them to India in the hope that Augustus Rudolf Hoernlé, a prominent scholar of Indo-Aryan languages, would be able to decipher them.

Unknown to Macartney, Islam Akhun's partner, Ibrahim Mullah, was also selling similar items to the Russian consul Nikolai Petrovsky. He sent them to St. Petersburg to be translated. Ibrahim Mullah had some knowledge of Cyrillic scripts, and so he incorporated Cyrillic characters, which proved very confusing for those scholars tasked with their translation.

Hoernlé set to work trying to decipher the texts. Although he could identify some as Brahmi script, in his first report on these collections, he wrote of others that they were:

... written in characters which are either quite unknown to me, or with which I am too imperfectly acquainted to attempt a ready reading in the scanty leisure that my regular official duties allow me ... My hope is that among those of my fellow-labourers who have made the languages of Central Asia their speciality, there may be some who may be able to recognize and identify the characters and language of these curious documents.

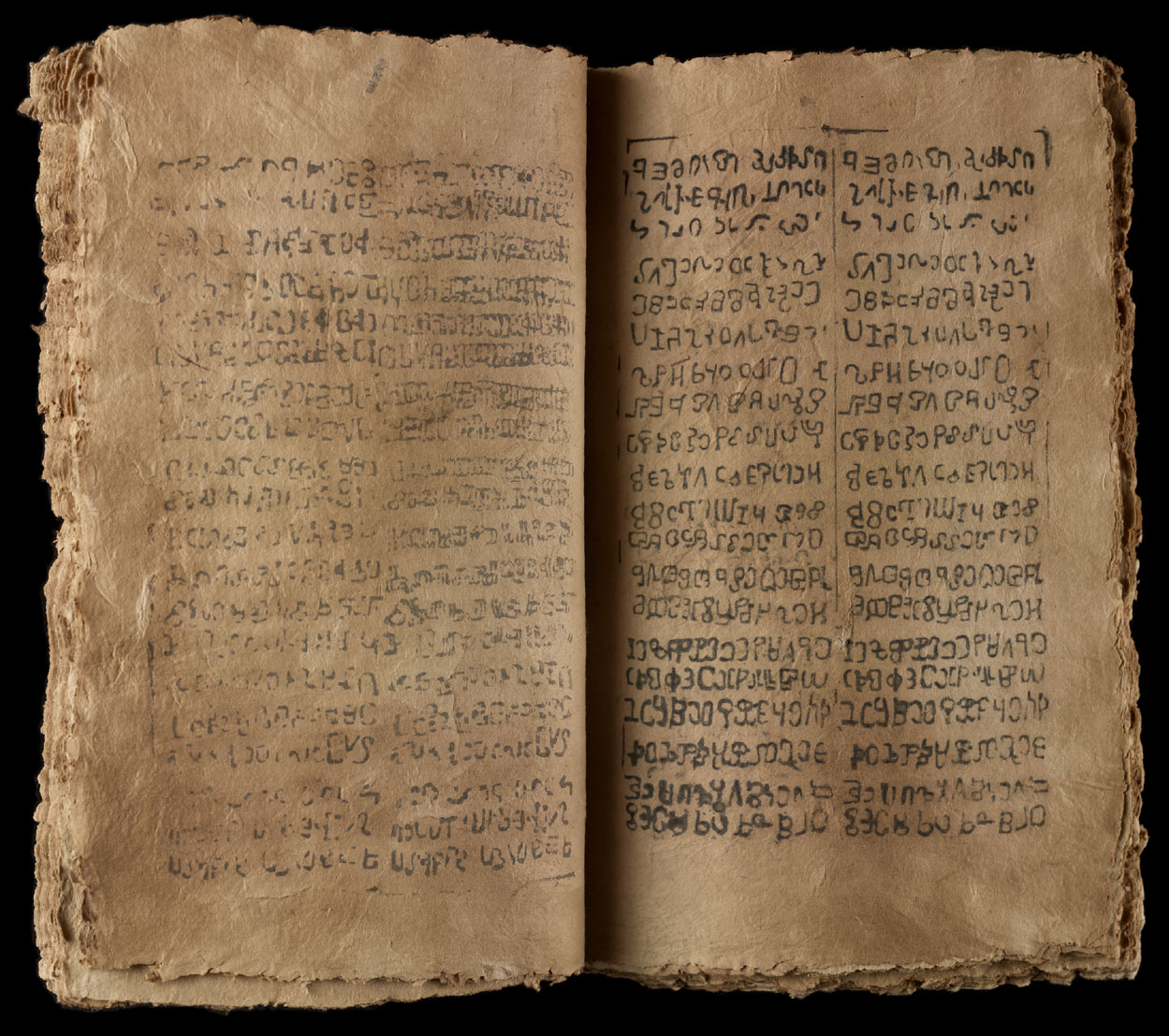
A forgery produced by woodblock printing by Islam Akhun and sold to George Macartney in Kashgar, 1896.

Islam Akhun and his colleague continued to sell items to the British and Russian consuls. By this time, they had started to produce woodblock prints as it increased production. Macartney also sent these to Hoernlé who, in 1899, published a second report. He gave an extensive account and divided them into nine different groups based on the kind of scripts in which they were written, which resembled Kharosthi, Indian and Central Asian Brahmi, Tibetan, Uyghur, Persian and Chinese. However, despite his detailed analysis, Hoernle was still unable to interpret them.

Doubts were soon raised about the authenticity of the manuscripts. Questions regarding the remarkably good condition of the scripts, their fortuitous discovery and bizarre script were raised, in particular by the Swedish missionary in Kashgar, Magnus Bäcklund, who had also been approached by Islam Akhun. Hoernlé discussed this issue in his 1899 report but decided in favour of their authenticity, recounting Islam Akhun's tale of the discovery of the manuscripts and documents in the ruined sites of the ancient Kingdom of Khotan in the Taklamakan Desert.

How can Islam Akhun and his comparatively illiterate confederates be credited with the no mean ingenuity necessary for excogitating [the scripts]? ... To sum up, the conclusion to which, with the present information, I have come, is that the scripts are genuine, and that most, if not all, of the block-prints in the Collection are also genuine antiquities, and that if any are forgeries, they can only be duplicates of others which are genuine.

== Exposing the forgers ==
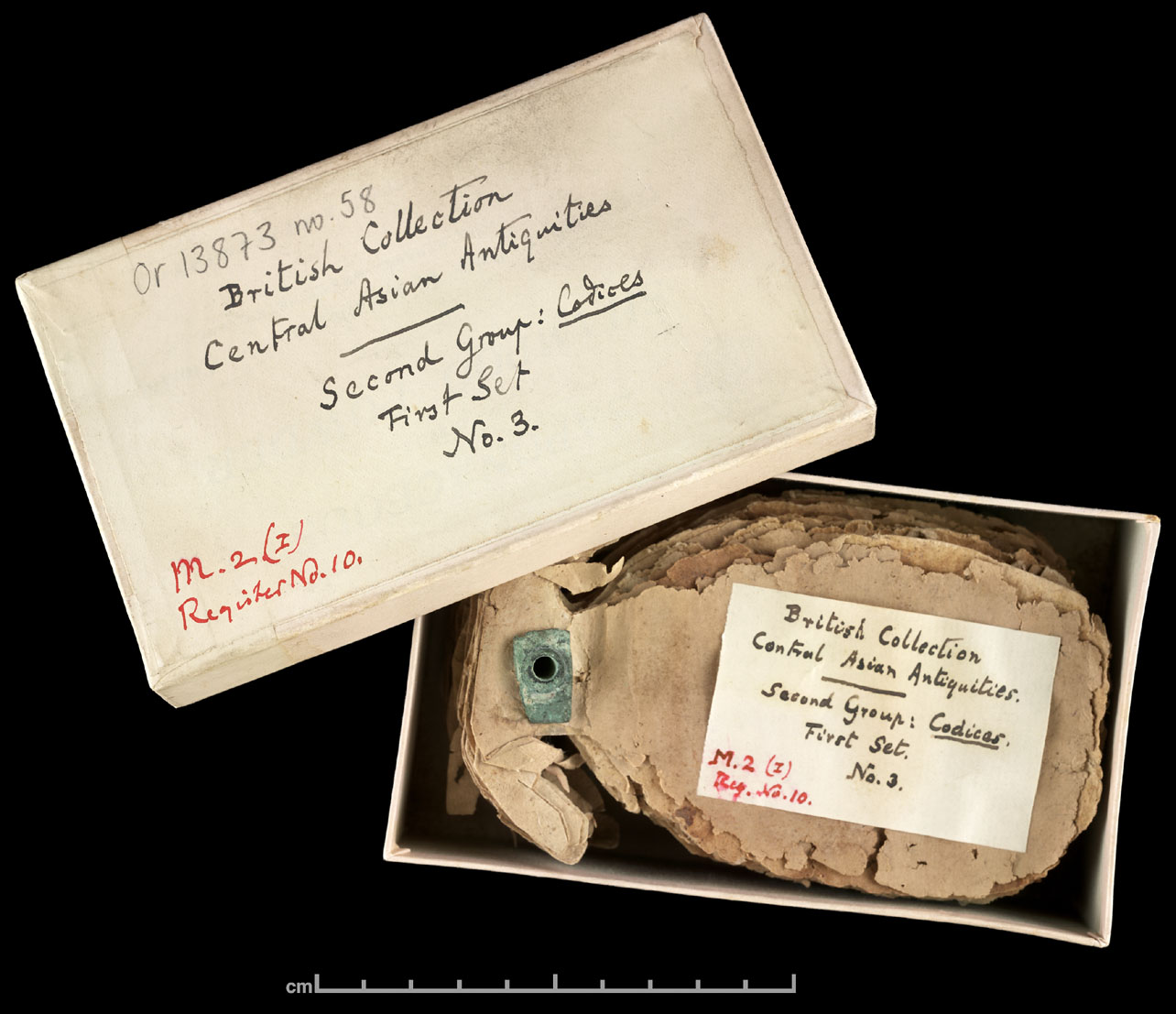
Forged manuscript sold to Macartney in 1896

It was, ironically, Hoernlé's report that re-asserted the suspicions of Aurel Stein — renowned archaeologist and Indo-Iranian scholar — regarding the authenticity of the manuscripts. During his first Central Asia expedition in 1900, Stein visited ancient sites of Khotan, but although he excavated many manuscripts, he found nothing similar to those sold by Islam Akhun. The local residents also did not have any knowledge of either the buried site nor the artefacts found there. In April 1901 Stein tracked down Islam Akhun in Khotan and questioned him over the course of two days.

Initially Islam Akhun claimed innocence, insisting he had only been an agent for Macartney, and had himself purchased the documents from other parties, knowing how much the British desired them. He apparently did not remember the account of discovery he had supplied originally, and certainly did not realise it had been published. It is probable that Islam Akhun feared further punishment having already received punishment for his desertion of a British group in 1898 (see below).

Faced with his own report, Islam Akhun eventually confessed to forging the manuscripts and block prints and described to Stein not only the factory he set up with Ibrahim Mullah, but their methodology, which involved staining the manuscripts with dye from the poplar or Toghrug, and smoking them to create an aged effect. He also mentioned that although initially he and his partner had hand-written the manuscripts and made an attempt to copy the Brahmi script from genuine manuscripts, such was the demand that they had moved onto woodblock printing. Stein did not take further action, but ensured he captured Islam Akhun on film in a photograph that he later published in his expedition account Ancient Khotan.

Stein had the sensitive task of breaking the news to Hoernlé, who was not only his mentor, but whom he had just succeeded in the post of Principal of the Calcutta Madrasah. He first wrote to Hoernle from Kashgar:

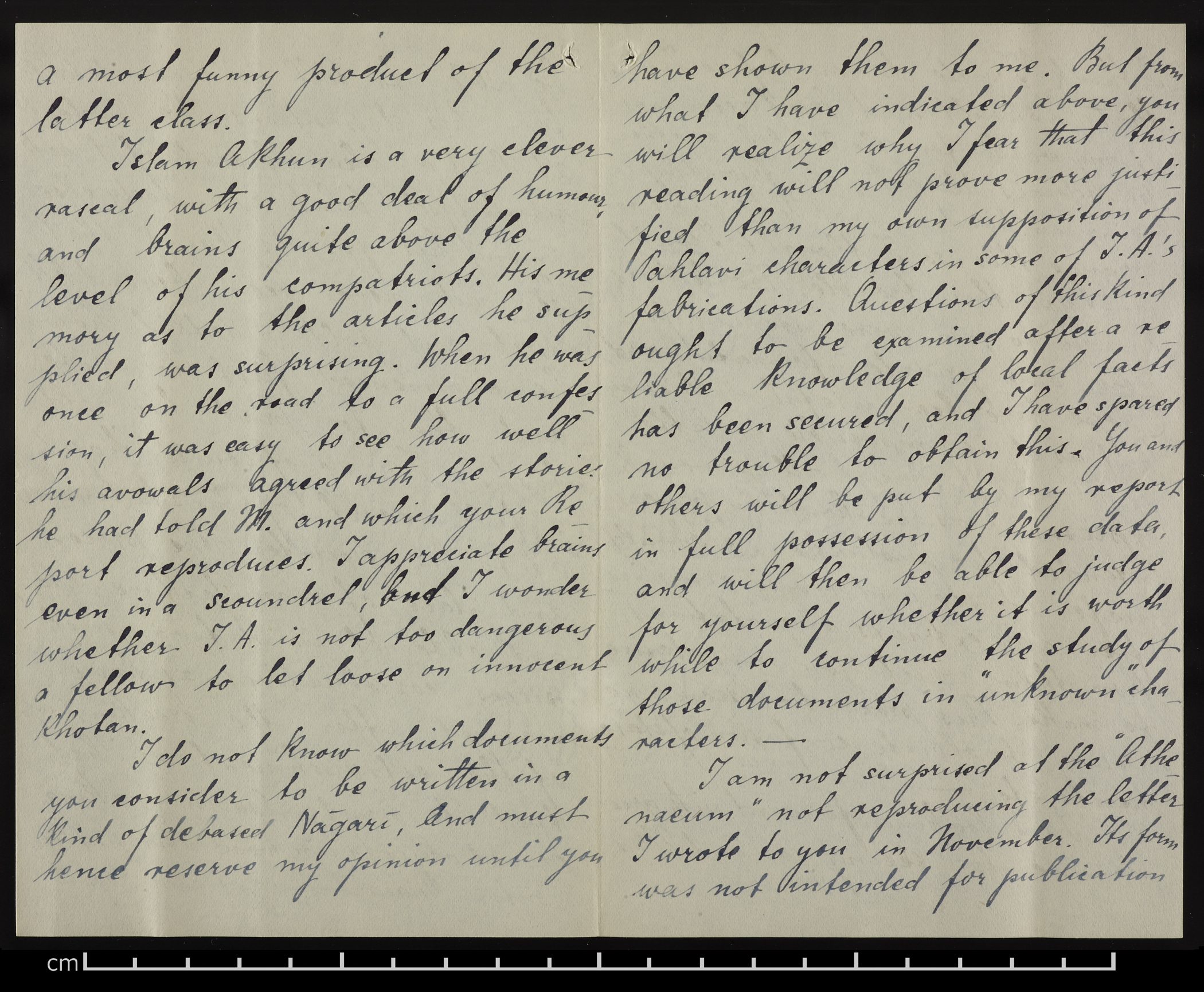
Letter from Stein to Hoernle, describing Akhun as a "very clever rascal"

"Islam Akhun is a very clever rascal, with a good deal of humour and brains quite above the level of his compatriots. His memory as to the articles he supplied was surprising. When he was once on the road to a full confession, it was easy to see how well his avowals agreed with the stories he had told M. and which your Report reproduces. I appreciate brains even in a scoundrel, and I wonder whether I. A. is not too dangerous a fellow to let loose on an innocent Khotan. ... I do not know which documents you consider to be written in a kind of debased Nāgarī, and must reserve my opinion until you have shown them to me. But from what I have indicated above, you will realize why I fear that this reading will not prove more justified than my own supposition of Pahlavi characters in some of I. A.'s fabrications. Questions of this kind ought to be examined after a reliable knowledge of local facts has been secured, and I have spared no trouble to obtain this. You and others will be put by my report in full possession of these dates, and will then be able to judge for yourself whether it is worth while to continue the study of those documents in "unknown" characters."

On his return to Britain, Stein met with Hoernle in his house in Oxford in July 1901. Hoernle hoped that his own report could be destroyed, but this was not possible as it had already been published. However, he was able to edit the second part before it went to print.

Many of the forgeries remain in the collections of the British Library and the Institute of Oriental Manuscripts, St. Petersburg.

== Other activities ==
In the early summer of 1898, Islam Akhun acted as an unwilling guide for the explorer Captain Deasy on an expedition to look for ancient sites near Guma. By the third day Islam Akhun had absconded, leaving the travellers to make their own way back. On his return, he forged a note in Deasy's handwriting to get money from Badruddin, the Aqsaqal (the official who looked after the interests of the Indian traders, reporting to the Consul-General in Kashgar). As punishment, he was sentenced to wear a cangue for a month.

Stein also reports various other dubious activities, including masquerading as a British agent searching for illegal slaves in order to blackmail locals. However, after the interrogation in 1901, Islam Akhun asked Stein to let him accompany him to Europe. Stein refused, and nothing more is known of him after that.
