= Annabel Walker =

English writer

Annabel Walker (active 1987 - present) is an English author, who grew up in South-West Devon. She read English and History at Bristol University and subsequently became a journalist working for the national press in London. Her first book, Kensington and Chelsea: A Social and Architectural History, was published by John Murray in 1987. In 1995, her biography of the explorer Aurel Stein (subsequently translated and published in Chinese) was reviewed in the TLS, The Spectator, as well as academic journals.

She is also the author of England from the Air. New York: H.N. Abrams, 1989.
