= Battle of Hiltersried =

Coordinates: 49°23′02″N 12°34′46″E

- Part of Hussite Wars
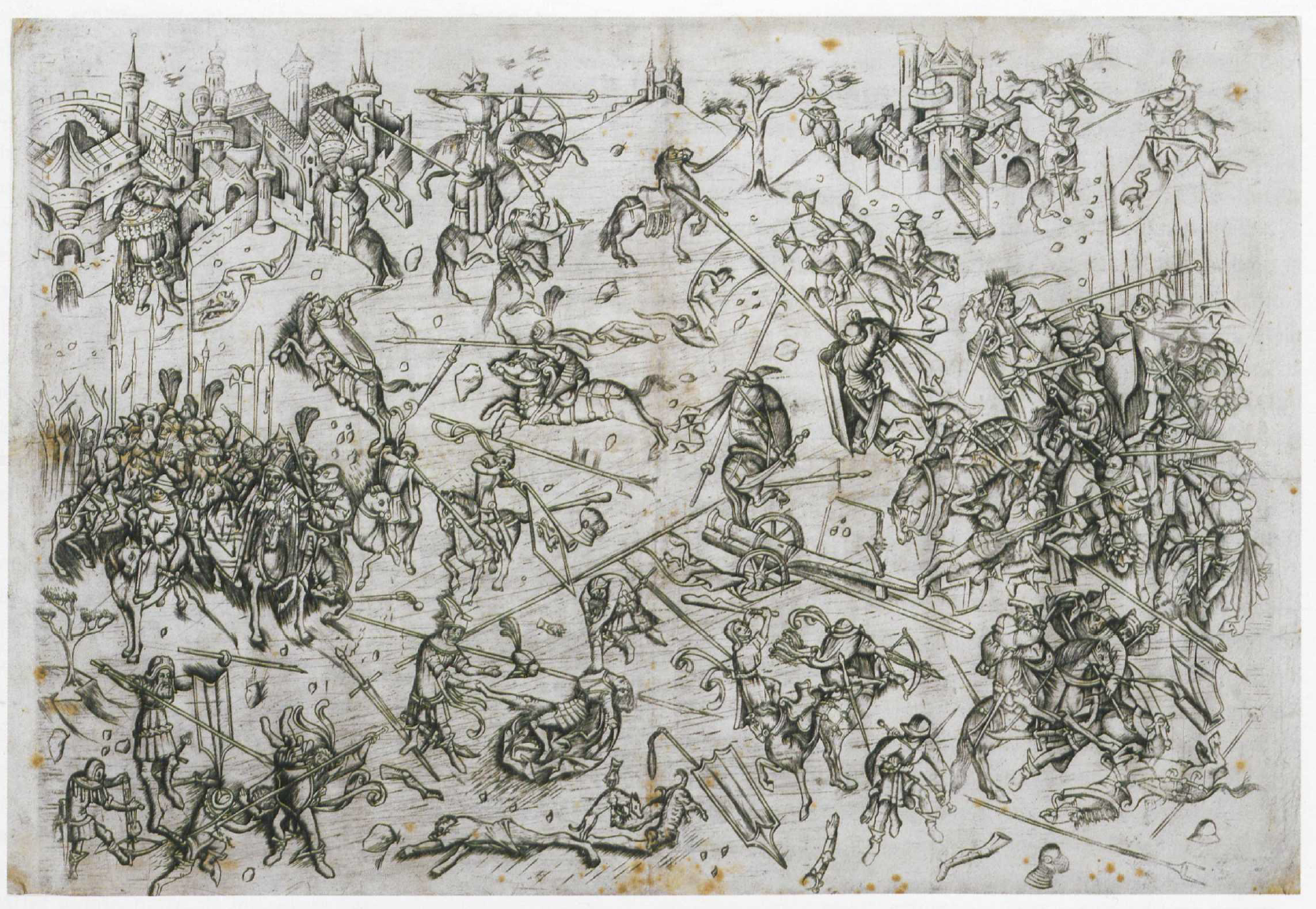
- Medieval graphics of the battle
Date	21 September 1433
Location	Hiltersried, Schönthal, Upper Palatinate (Electoral Palatinate, today's Bavaria)
Result	Palatine victory

Belligerents
Electoral Palatinate: Upper Palatinate	Hussites

Commanders and leaders
John of Neumarkt; Hynčík Pflug of Rabstein	Jan Pardus; Jan Řitka

Strength
1,200	2,000

Casualties and losses
140 killed	1,500; 300 wounded prisoners

The Battle of Hiltersried took place on 21 September 1433 near the village Hiltersried in Bavaria. A Bavarian feudal army under Count Palatine John of Neumarkt took an expedition into the Upper Palatinate against marauding Hussites and soundly defeated the Hussite section whose task was to ensure the protection for troops besieging Pilsen. The Hussites, who on that day were not expecting any attack, were totally surprised and did not have time to prepare to defend. After a sharp firing of crossbows, the mounted knights attacked in wedge formation toward the entrance to the camp. At the same time the infantry attacked from the wings, binding part of the struggle of defenders. After the Palatinate knighthood broke the defense and burst into the camp, the defenders started to rout. Knights of the Palatinate took chase.

During the fighting and the pursuit, about 1,500 Hussites were killed and 300 taken prisoner. Their commander escaped, however, and led 130 Taborites from the battlefield and headed for Pilsen. Losses among the knighthood of Palatinate were only 14 dead and about 120 wounded. The failure at Hiltersried led to internal clashes within the ranks of the Hussites, public opinion among the Hussites at Pilsen turned against the organizers Jan Pardus and Jan Řitka of Bezdědice and led to several days of imprisonment for the spiritual administrator of the Tabor municipality Prokop, who defended both captains. The Hussite movement was falling apart from the inside, contributing to the end of the Hussite wars. It was one of the major battles in which documents the Hussites.
