= John, Count Palatine of Neumarkt =

Count Palatine of Neumarkt (1410-1443)

John
- Count Palatine of Neumarkt
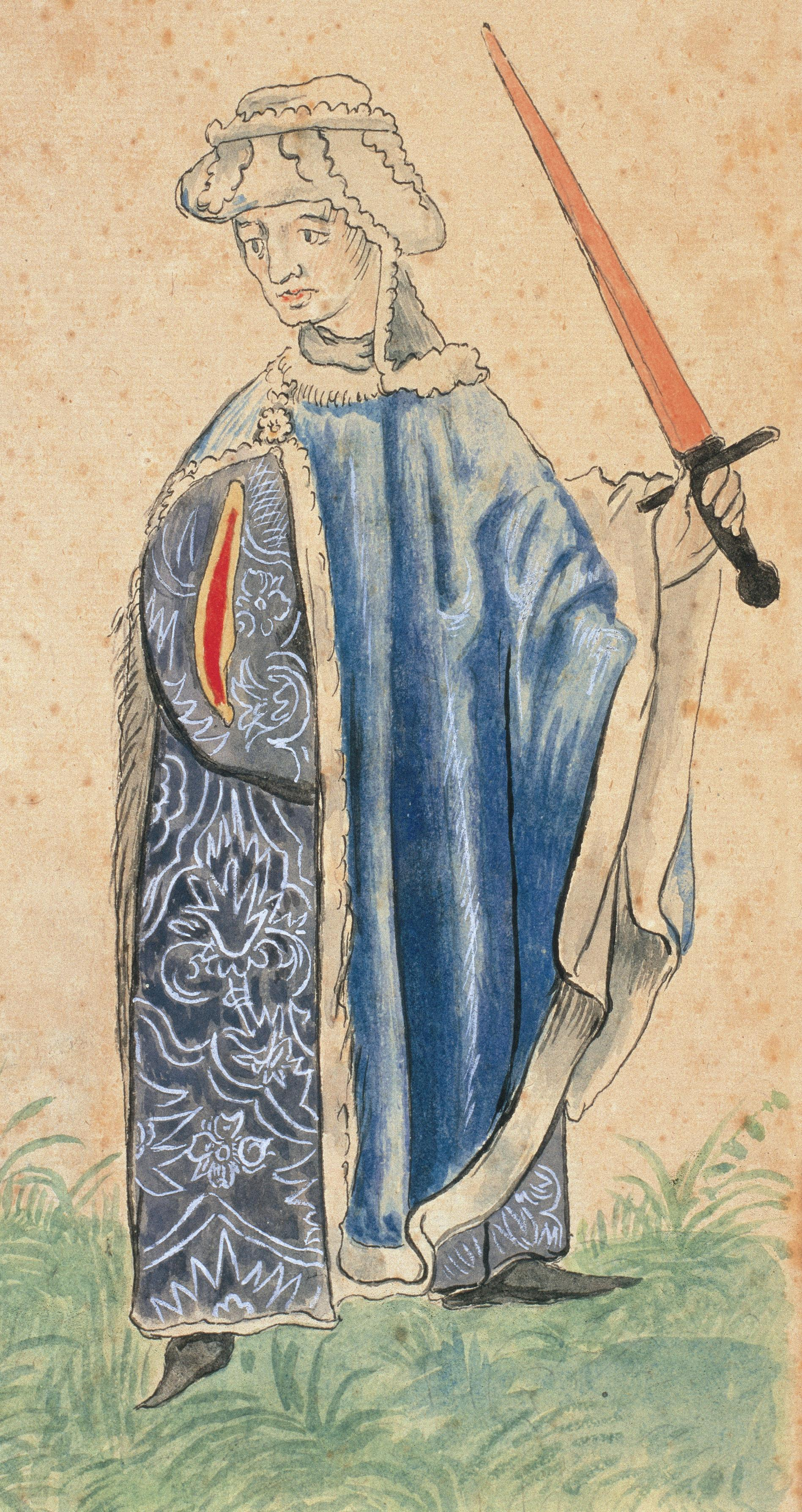
- Born: 1383; Neunburg vorm Wald
- Died: 14 March 1443 (aged 59–60); Kastl
- Noble family: Wittelsbach (Palatinate-Neumarkt branch)
- Spouse: Catherine of Pomerania
- Issue: Christopher of Bavaria
- Father: Rupert, King of the Romans
- Mother: Elisabeth of Nuremberg

John (German: Johann; 1383 – 14 March 1443) was the Count Palatine of Neumarkt from 1410 to his death. The son of Rupert III of the Palatinate, he married Catherine of Pomerania in 1407. He is mainly known for his crushing victory against the Hussites at the Battle of Hiltersried in 1433. His son, Christopher, later became king of the Kalmar Union.
