= Weber Manuscript =

The Weber Manuscript, also called Weber Manuscripts, is a collection of nine, possibly eleven, incomplete ancient Indian treatises written mostly in classical Sanskrit that were found buried within a Buddhist monument in northwestern China in late 19th-century. It is named after the Moravian missionary F. Weber who acquired the set from an Afghani merchant in Ladakh, and then forwarded it to the German Indologist and philologist Rudolf Hoernlé in Calcutta. The manuscripts consist of 76 page-leaves, written in Northwestern Gupta and Central Asian Nagari (Turkestanic Brahmi, slanting Gupta) scripts. They were copied before the end of 7th-century, likely in the 5th-century or the 6th–century. The original texts that were copied to produce these manuscripts were likely considerably older Indian texts, at least one between 3rd-century BCE and pre-2nd-century CE. The Weber Manuscript is notable for having been written on two types of paper – Central Asian and Nepalese, attesting to the spread of paper technology outside of interior China and its use for Indian religious texts by the 5th– or 6th-century.

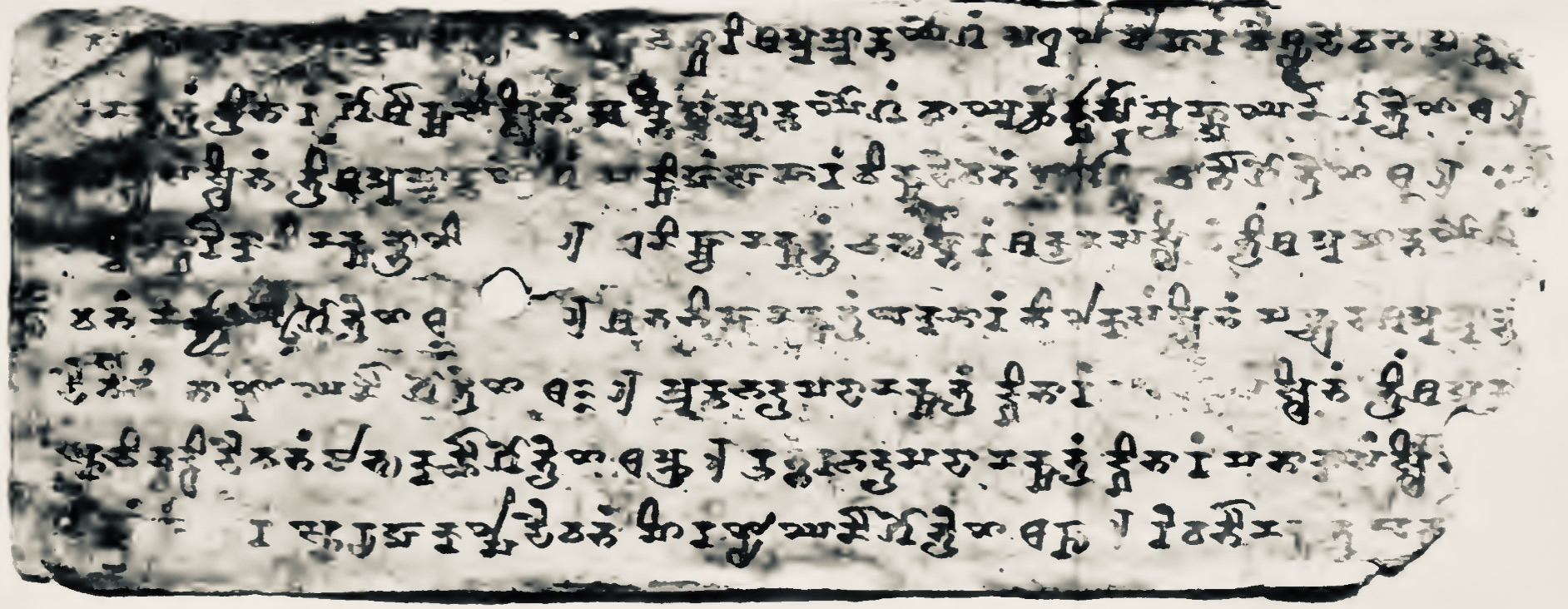
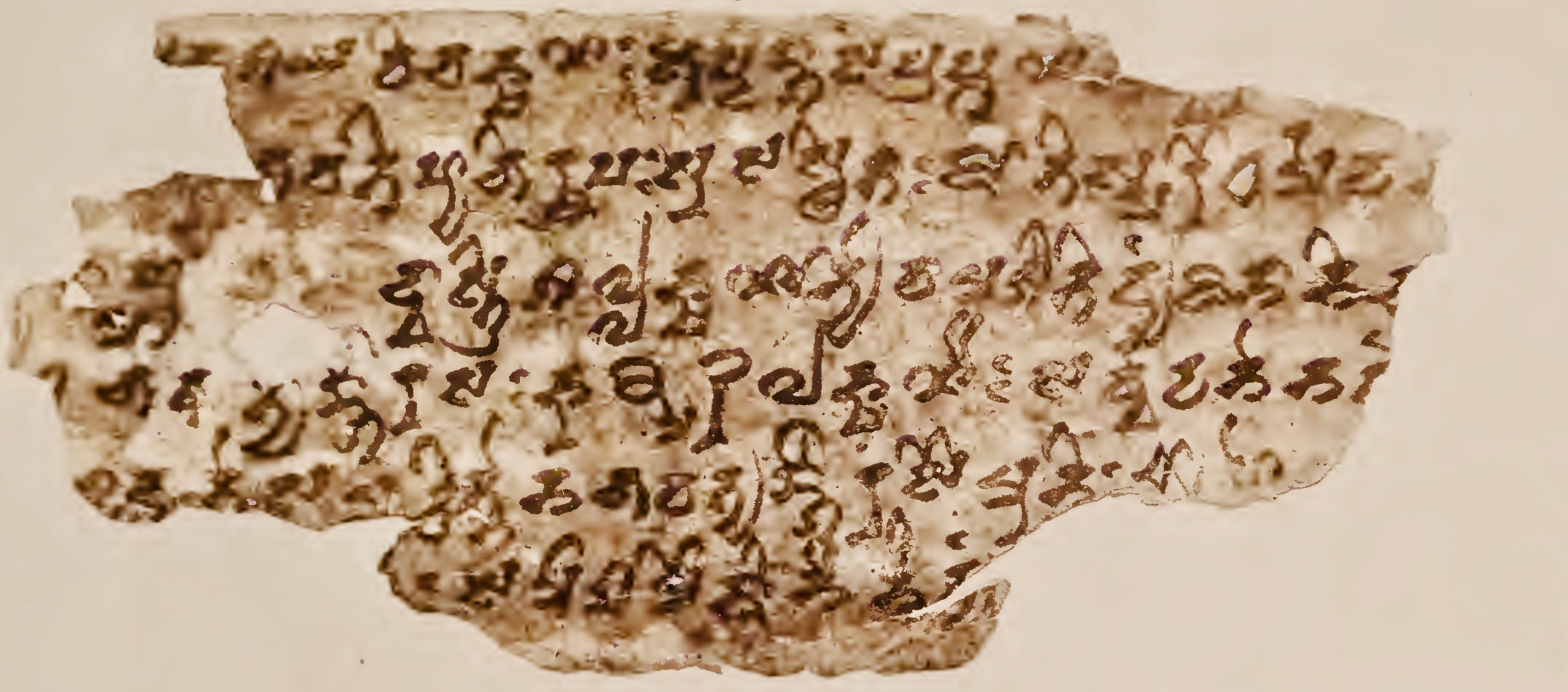
The Weber manuscripts (above) were, like the Bower manuscript, discovered near Kucha (Xinjiang China). Hoernle noted that these were a collection of 9 Sanskrit manuscript fragments on paper produced in 5th- to 6th-century CE in different parts of Asia.

The Weber Manuscripts include fragments of:

- a manuscript of a Sanskrit dictionary (kosha),
- an astronomical treatise based on the movement of the moon with Vedic terms and 28 nakshatras (lunar zodiacs),
- a goddess Parvati stotra with Rudra and Shiva–related Hindu mythology treatise in the style of Puranas,
- an eulogistic text on Vedic rishi Angirasa but with some Buddhistic terms,
- a Buddhist dharani and sorcery treatise in a "barbarous mixture of Pali and Sanskrit" according to Hoernle,
- a Buddhist treatise on snake charm (dharani) that praises the Buddha and claims the charm was taught by the Buddha to Mahayaksha Manibhadra, includes a list of names of some Nagas (snakes)
- another Buddhist treatise on snake charm (dharani) quite similar to the previous treatise in content, also includes a list of names of some Nagas
- a treatise for treating some disease by fasting, penance, then preparing and taking a prescription, includes medical charms
- an unclear text in a different language but with Sanskrit words, possibly a Buddhist tantric work

The scribes were likely Buddhist because the Weber Manuscript was discovered in the ruins of a Buddhist monastery, the treatises include verses that praise the Buddha though the predominant language isn't Pali, is either mostly accurate classical Sanskrit or occasionally a crude mix of Pali and Sanskrit. Even the Sanskrit dictionary includes a phrase ksatriyair Buddha-nirjitaih, or "Kshatriyas conquered by Buddha", which suggests that the author was probably Buddhist.

The Weber Manuscripts are currently preserved in the collections of the Bodleian Library in Oxford.

== Discovery ==
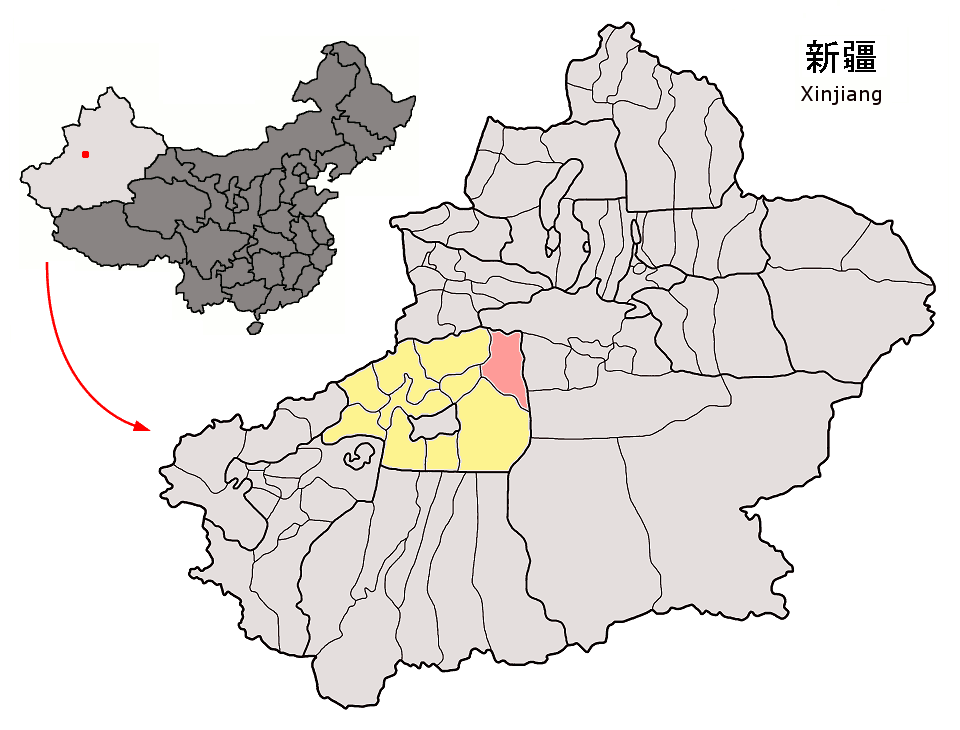
The Weber Manuscript was found in Kucha, China (red dot above), the same location as the Bower Manuscript.

Hoernle received the Weber Manuscript from Leh-based F. Weber in 1893. At that time, based on what he was told, he reported that the manuscript was discovered 60 miles south of Yarkand. However, interviews and surveys conducted between 1893 and 1900, persuaded Hoernle that the Weber Manuscript came from Kucha, the same location as the Bower Manuscript. These were found by the same Muslim treasure hunters who were digging up Kucha area Buddhist ruins in late 19th-century. These manuscript bundles were likely opened by the treasure hunters, carelessly examined, got jumbled as they put them back into separate parts to sell. They sought different buyers for each part. Two of the parts were bought in India and another by a buyer from Russia. The India-based buyers forwarded them to Rudolf Hoernle, and these came to be called the Weber Manuscript and McCartney Manuscript. The Russian portion came to be called the Petrovski Manuscript and became a part of the Sanskrit manuscripts collection in Saint Petersburg. Some of the folio leaves of these various manuscripts are of the same treatise. The Petrovski Manuscript – also referred to as Petrovsky Manuscript, St Petersburg Asiatic Museum catalog number SI P/33 – was studied by the Indologist Sergey Oldenburg in the 1890s and thereafter. He identified some parts as portions of some sutra and the start of the appendix. These were established by Fukita Takamichi in 1989 as parts of Nidanasutra and Nagaropomasutra (dharani).
