= Bower Manuscript =

Manuscript on early treatise of Indian Medicine

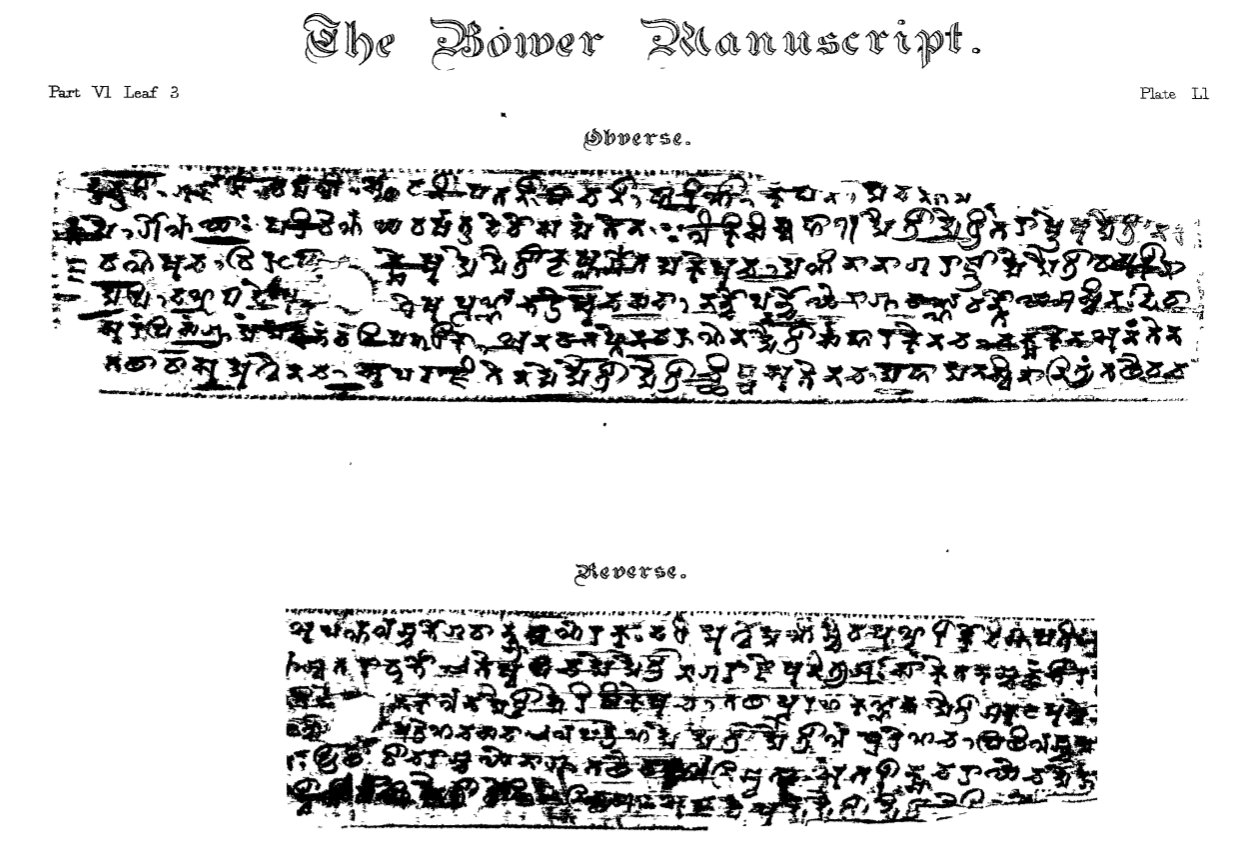
The Bower Manuscript

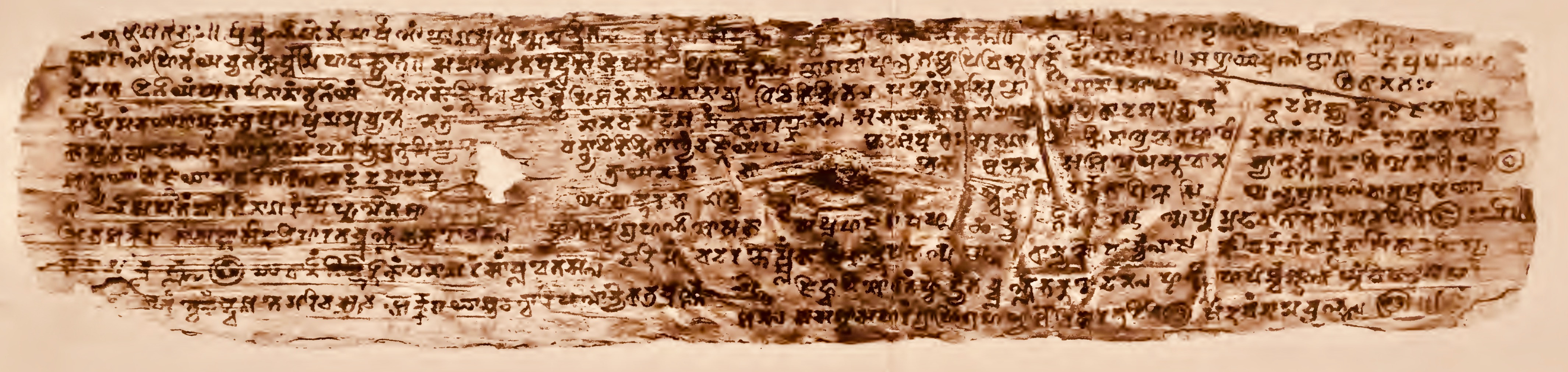
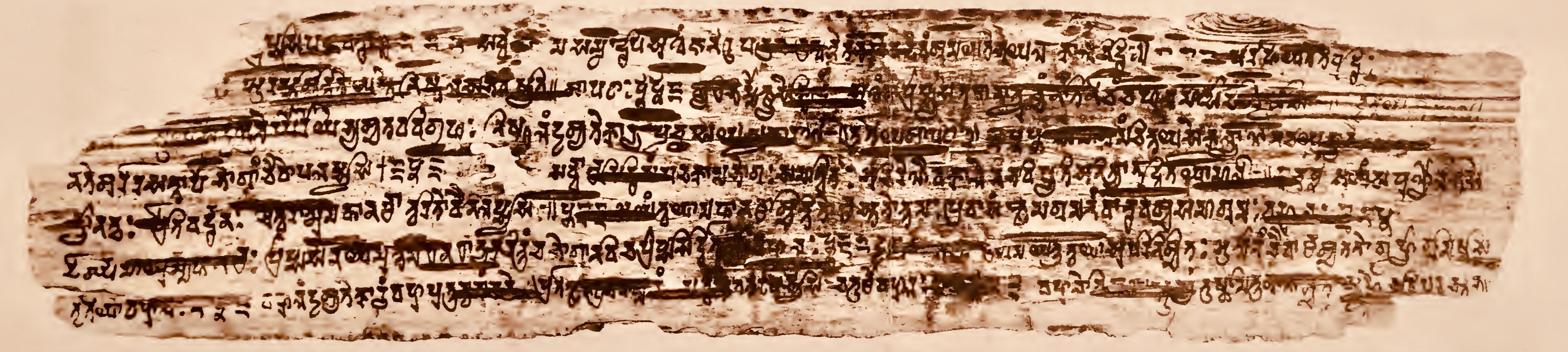
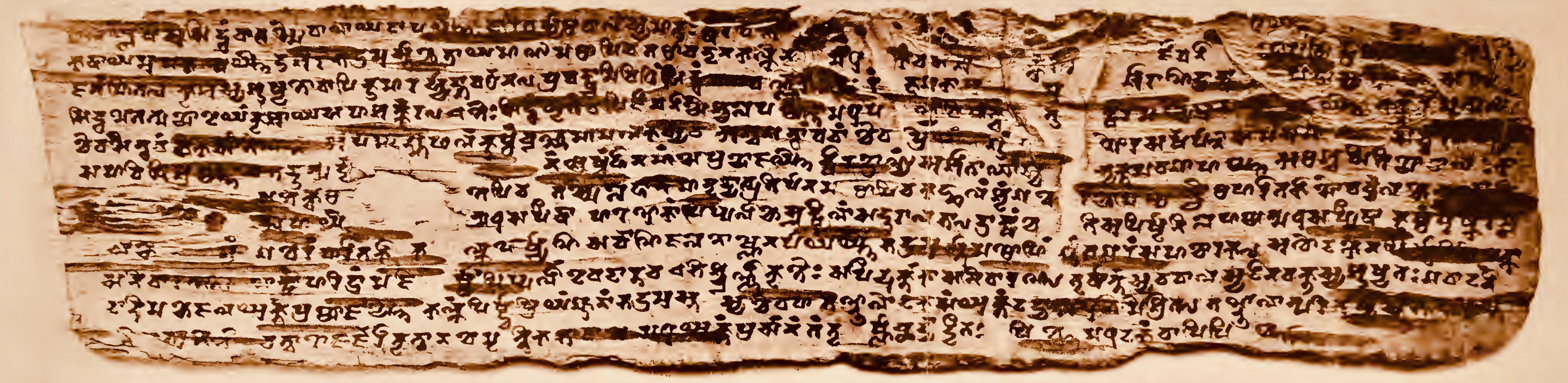
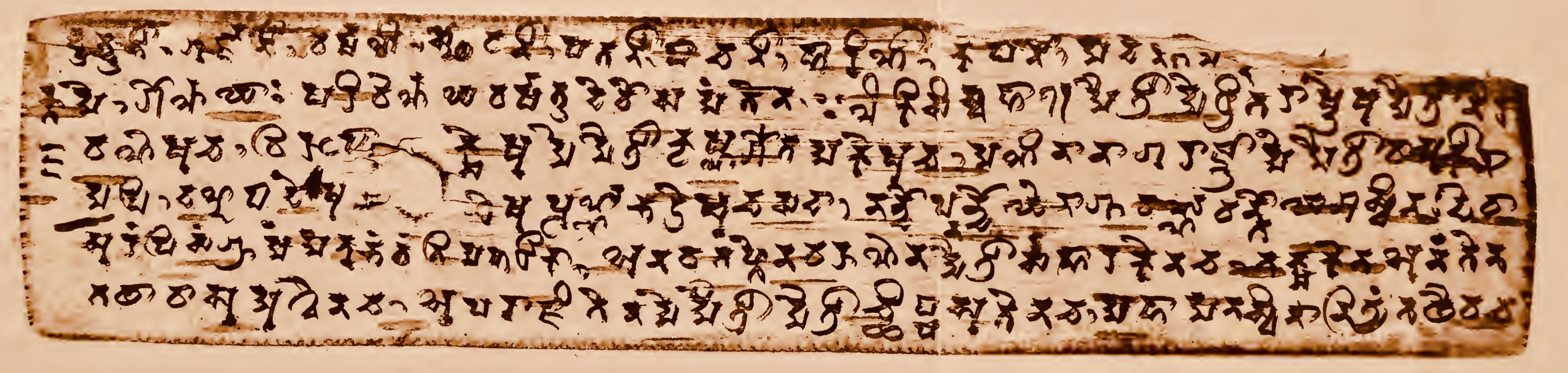
The Bower Manuscript is a late 5th or early 6th-century collection of Sanskrit texts (above) in early Gupta script. Discovered near Kucha (China), it includes an ancient Indian medical treatise (33 leaves), and several other treatises (23 leaves). Samples of both are shown above.

The Bower Manuscript is a collection of seven fragmentary Sanskrit treatises found buried in a Buddhist memorial stupa near Kucha, northwestern China. Written in early Gupta script (late Brahmi) on birch bark, it is variously dated in 5th to early 6th century. The Bower manuscript includes the oldest dated fragments of an Indian medical text, the Navanitaka.

Of the seven treatises included in the collection, three on Ayurvedic medicine, two on divination by dice, and two on incantations (Dharani) against snake bites. The collection had at least four scribes, of whom three were likely Buddhists because the second, the sixth and the seventh treatises open by invoking the Buddha and other Buddhist deities. Two invoke Shiva, Vishnu, Devi, and other Hindu deities. The discovery of the manuscript in remote China near the Central Asian region is considered evidence of the spread and sharing of ideas in ancient times between India, China and Central Asia. It also contains excerpts of the Bhela Samhita, a medical text whose damaged manuscript is in Tanjavur, Tamil Nadu. The medical fragments of the Bower manuscript have much in common with other ancient Sanskrit medical treatises such as those by Caraka, Ravigupta, Vagbhata and Kashyapa.

The manuscript is named after Hamilton Bower – a British Lieutenant who bought the manuscript in March 1890 while on a mission to chase an assassin who was charged with hacking Andrew Dalgleish to death. The fragmentary manuscript was analyzed, edited, translated, and published by Calcutta-based Rudolf Hoernle. The Bower Manuscript is preserved in the collections of the Bodleian Library in Oxford.

== Discovery and edition ==
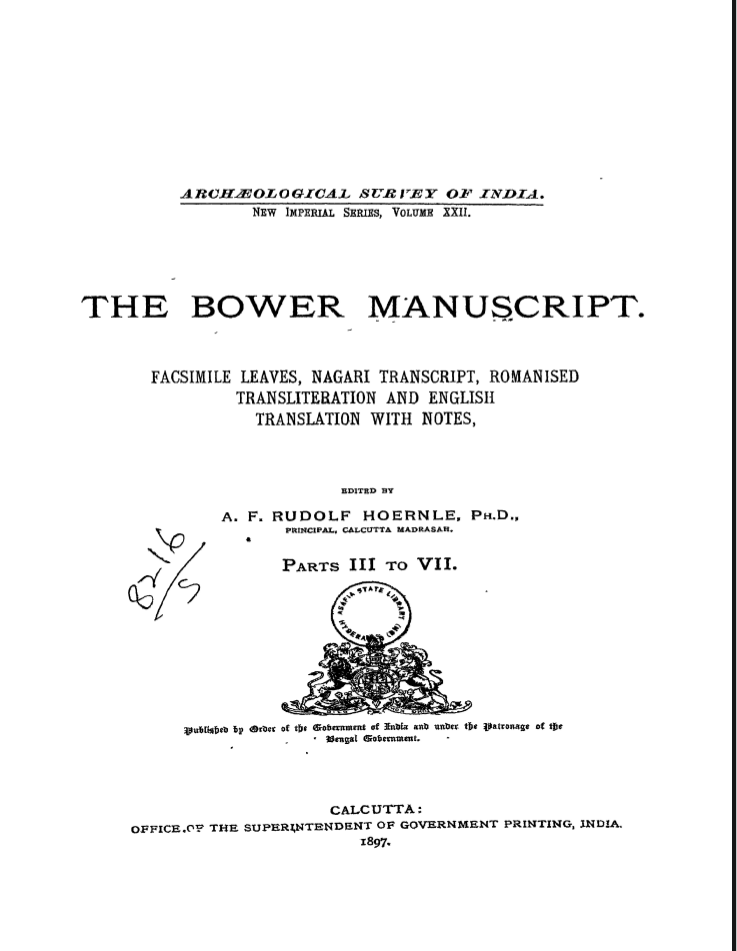
Hoernle's 1897 text and translation of manuscripts Parts III to VII

The Bower Manuscript is named after its accidental purchaser Hamilton Bower, a British Army Lieutenant. The story begins with the brutal murder of Andrew Dalgleish, a Scotsman camping in the Karakoram mountains, north of Kashmir. He was hacked to death inside his tent by an Afghan named Dad Mahomed. The British government wanted to bring Mahomed to justice, and therefore sent Hamilton Bower with some troops to go after the killer, states Wujastyk. Mahomed learned about the effort and escaped. Bower, in the chase, followed Mahomed through the Himalayan valleys into the Takla Makan desert. Bower arrived near Kucha (Xinjiang) in early March 1890 and set his camp. On the night of 2 or 3 March, a man came to his tent and offered to sell him old manuscripts and artifacts that his treasure hunters had found. Bower bought them.

Bower took the manuscripts with him when he returned to Simla and forwarded it to Colonel James Waterhouse, the then President of the Asiatic Society of Bengal. Waterhouse reported the manuscript at the monthly meeting of the Society on 5 November 1890, whose proceedings were widely distributed. At the meeting, he stated that Bower visited the site where the manuscript was found, and referred to the stupa as something that looked like a huge "cottage loaf" near the "Ming–oi" Buddhist monastery ruins, 16 miles from Kucha near the banks of a river. Waterhouse mentioned that the Bower manuscript had 56 leaves (the edition now preserved at Bodleian Library has 51 leaves). He reported that the Bower manuscript was bound with two wooden boards on either end and a string running through a hole. He had sought the help of Babu Sarat Chandra Das and Lama Phuntshog to decipher the manuscript. Neither was able to read the script and said it must be "very ancient", according to Waterhouse.

The Waterhouse report was reprinted in Bombay Gazette, where Hoernle learned about it and became very eager to study it. After the meeting, in parallel, some attempts were made to decipher the manuscript, but they proved unsuccessful. German Indologist Georg Buhler succeeded in reading and translating two leaves of the manuscript, reproduced in the form of heliogravures in the Proceedings of the Asiatic Society of Bengal.

Immediately after his return to India in February 1891, Hoernle began to study the manuscript. He found that the manuscript leaves were jumbled out of sequence, but had the page numbers marked on the left. After re-arranging them, he concluded that it was an abridged collection of several different treatises. He presented the first decipherment two months later, at the meeting of the Society in April 1891, with evidence that it was "the oldest Indian written book that is known to exist". Between 1893 and 1897 Hoernle published a complete edition of the text, featuring an annotated English translation and illustrated facsimile plates. A Sanskrit Index was published in 1908, and a revised translation of the medical portions (I, II, and III) in 1909; the Introduction appeared in 1912.

== Description and dating ==
The 'Bower Manuscript' is a collation of seven treatise manuscripts, compiled into a larger group and another a smaller one. The larger manuscript is a fragmentary convolute of six treatises (Part I, II, III, IV, V and VII), which are separately paginated, with each leaf approximately 29 square inches (190 cm^{2}) (11.5 by 2.5 inches [292 mm × 64 mm]). Part VI is written on smaller folio leaves, both in length and breadth, with each leaf approximately 18 square inches (120 cm^{2}) (9 by 2 inches [229 mm × 51 mm]). The larger group and the smaller set likely came from different trees or region. The scribes wrote on both sides of the leaves but did not use both sides when the leaf was very thin. These seven constituent manuscripts are numbered as Parts I to VII in Hoernle's edition.

The Bower manuscript, as discovered, had 56 birch bark leaves, cut into oblong palmyra shape (rectangular strips with rounded corners). This is the form commonly found in numerous ancient and medieval Indian manuscript books (pothī). The pages are bound in Indian style, with each leaf containing a hole about the middle of the left side, for the passage of the binding string. The undamaged leaves of the Bower manuscript are numbered on the left edge of the reverse side, a tradition found in ancient pothi manuscripts in north India, in contrast to the historic south Indian tradition of numbering the obverse side in manuscripts. This suggests that the Bower manuscript scribes were trained in the north Indian tradition.

The seven parts of the manuscript are written in an essentially identical script, the Gupta script (late Brahmi) found in north, northwest and western regions of ancient India. Early attempts to date the text placed it around 5th-century, largely on palaeographic grounds. Hoernle determined that the manuscript belonged to the 4th or 5th–century because the script used matched with dated inscriptions and other texts of that period in the north and northwest India. He also compared the style and script for numerals – particularly zero and position value – and the page numbering style in the manuscript with those found in Indian inscriptions and manuscripts. By combining such evidence with palaeographic evidence therein, he concluded that the Bower manuscript could not be dated in or after the second half of the 6th century. Hoernle remarked that at least some treatises of the manuscript "must fall somewhere within that period [470 and 530 CE], that is, about 500 CE."

Winand M. Callewaert dates it to c. 450 CE. According to a 1986 analysis by Lore Sander, the Bower manuscript is best dated between 500 and 550 CE.

=== Scribes ===
The fragmentary treatises are copies of much older Indian texts authored by unknown scholars. These treatises were prepared by scribes, buried in a stupa built at some point to honor the memory of a Buddhist monk or some other regional influential person. Hoernle distinguished four scribes, based on their handwriting, subtle font and style differences. One scribe wrote Parts I, II and III; second wrote Part IV; third wrote Parts V and VII; while a fourth wrote Part VI. He added that there may have been more than four scribes, because Part VI has some scribal differences, while V and VII too seems cursive and careless work of possibly more than one person.

Based on the handwriting and fonts prevalent in the inscriptions discovered in India from that era, Hoernle suggested the first scribe who wrote Parts I through III likely grew up and came from Kashmir or Udyana (North India) to Kucha (China) because his writing shows early Sarada script influences. Part VI, and possibly V and VII were written by scribe(s) who may have come to China from a region that is now the central India to Andhra Pradesh, for similar reasons. The writer of part IV appears to have the style of someone used to "writing with a brush", and therefore may have been a local native or a Buddhist monk who came from interior China.

== Contents ==
The text consists of seven separate and different treatises, of which first three are on medicine, next two on divination, and last two on magical incantations. The three medicinal treatises contain content that is also found in the ancient Indian text called the Caraka Samhita. Treatises I to III are the medical treatises of the collection and contain 1,323 verses and some prose. The metrical writing suggests that the scribe of the three medical treatises was well versed in Sanskrit composition. The scribe of divination and incantation sections (Treatises IV-VII) was not conversant with classical Sanskrit, made grammatical errors and used a few Prakrit words.

The manuscript is mostly in the Shloka verse style – a Vedic anuṣṭubh poetic meter (exceptions are found in Part I of the collection). The Bower Manuscript is written in the Gupta script – a type of late Brahmi script.

=== Medical treatises ===
Part I has 5 leaves, and the incomplete treatise ends abruptly. It is a fragment of a treatise on garlic, it medicinal properties and recipes, its use for eye diseases. It opens with a flowery description of the Himalayas, where a group of rishis reside, interested in the names and properties of medicinal plants. It mentions Hindu sages such as Ātreya, Hārīta, Parāśara, Bhela, Garga, Śāmbavya, Suśruta, Vasiṣṭha, Karāla, and Kāpya. Suśruta, whose curiosity is aroused by a particular plant, approaches muni Kāśirāja, enquiring about the nature of this plant. Kāśīrāja, granting his request, tells him about the origin of the plant, which proves to be garlic (Sanskrit laśuna), its properties and uses. The section on garlic consists of 43 verses in poetic meter. This section also mentions the ancient Indian tradition of "garlic festival", as well as a mention of sage Sushruta in Benares (Varanasi). This is the part where the initial 43 verses are in eighteen different, uncommon meters (Sanskrit prosody) such as the vasanta tilaka, trishtubh and arya, while the verses thereafter are in the shloka style. The verses credit the knowledge to past sages. Verse 9, for example, attributes the knowledge to Susruta, who received it from the sage king of Kashi.

Part II abruptly ends on the 33rd folio of the Bower manuscript. It is voluminous, relative to the other six treatises, and contains medical prescriptions sections on powder, medicated ghee (clarified butter), oil, elixirs, aphrodisiacs, decoctions, dyes and ointments. It opens with a salutation addressed to the Tathāgatas, contains, as stated by the scribe, the Navanītaka text (lit. "cream" text), a standard manual (siddhasaṃkarṣa). Then it states its intention to provide 16 chapters of prescriptions (but the surviving fragment only provides 14, ending abruptly). According to G.J. Meulenbeld, "an important peculiarity of the Bower MS consists of its varying attitude towards the number of the doṣas [humours]. In many instances, it accepts the traditional number of three, vāta, pitta, and kapha, but in a smaller number of passages it also appears to accept blood (rakta) as a doṣa."

Part III consists of 4 leaves and also ends abruptly on the obverse side of the folio (Part IV starts on reverse). It starts with the symbol Om as usual with the other treatises, and is a short treatise on 14 prescription formulary in a manner similar to Part II. It consists of 72 shlokas. It is a fragment whose contents correspond to chapters one to three of the Part II.

=== Divination treatises ===
Parts IV and V contain two short manuals of Pāśaka kevalī, or cubomancy, i.e., the art of foretelling a person's future by means of the cast of dice, a ritualistic practice found in Tibetan manuscripts. Part IV is almost complete, while the manual constituting Part V is markedly more fragmentary and defective. The dice is stated to be a group of three dice, each with four faces (tetrahedron) numbered 1, 2, 3 and 4. When cast, it would yield one of 64 possible casts, of which 60 combinations are listed in Part IV (the missing 4 may be scribal error or lost; but those 4 are mentioned in later verses). Hoernle mentioned that Part V is similar to other Sanskrit manuscripts discovered in Gujarat, and like it, these parts of the Bower manuscript may be one of the several recensions of a more ancient common source on divinatory work. These are traditionally attributed to the ancient sage Garga, but maybe an influence of the Greek oracle tradition during the post-Alexander the Great period.

=== Dharani treatises ===
Parts VI and VII contain two different portions of the same text, the Mahāmāyurī, Vidyārājñī, a Buddhist dhāraṇī-genre incantations text. The Mayuri text, in later centuries, became a part of the Pancha-raksha magical incantations group – one of the highly popular dharani sets in Buddhist communities in and outside India. Part VI of the Bower manuscript contains charms against cobra bite, while Part VII is for protecting against other evils befalling a person. Both these parts are a small select portion of the actual Mayuri text, and tiny compared to the much larger dharani compilations. Part VI is complete, written on better quality birch and is the most well preserved treatise in the Bower manuscript. According to Watanabe, the verses of these treatises as found in folio 49 to 54 of the Bower manuscript completely correspond to those found in Mahamayurividya-rajni verses of the Chinese Tripitaka, in particular to the 705 CE translation by I-tsing, the 746–771 CE translation by Amoghavajra, and the 516 CE translation by Sanghapala. Their shared source may be Pali verses in the Mora Jataka, with interpolations by Mahayana Buddhists of that era. These parts of the Bower manuscript also contain the name Yashomitra, likely the votary or the influential person for whom the manuscript was prepared. According to Hoernle, Yashomitra may well have been a Buddhist monk of great repute, the one for whom the stupa was built, and in whose memory the manuscript was prepared and buried in the stupa mound.

== Legacy ==
The discovery of the Bower Manuscript, its antiquity, and its decipherment by Hoernle triggered "enormous excitement" in the 1890s, states Wujastyk. Famous explorers were commissioned by some of the world's major powers of the era – such as Britain, Germany, Japan, France, Russia – to go on a Central Asia and Xinjiang expedition. They were to seek manuscripts and other ancient treasures. These expeditions yielded major discoveries such as the Dunhuang manuscripts, as well as famous forgeries such as those of Islam Akhun, in the decades that followed.

The European Union-funded International Dunhuang Project has continued the legacy of the Bower manuscript which in part inspired Rudolf Hornle to seek funds from the then Government of India to finance the first 1900–1901 expedition of Marc Aurel Stein.
