= Schönthal =

- Municipality
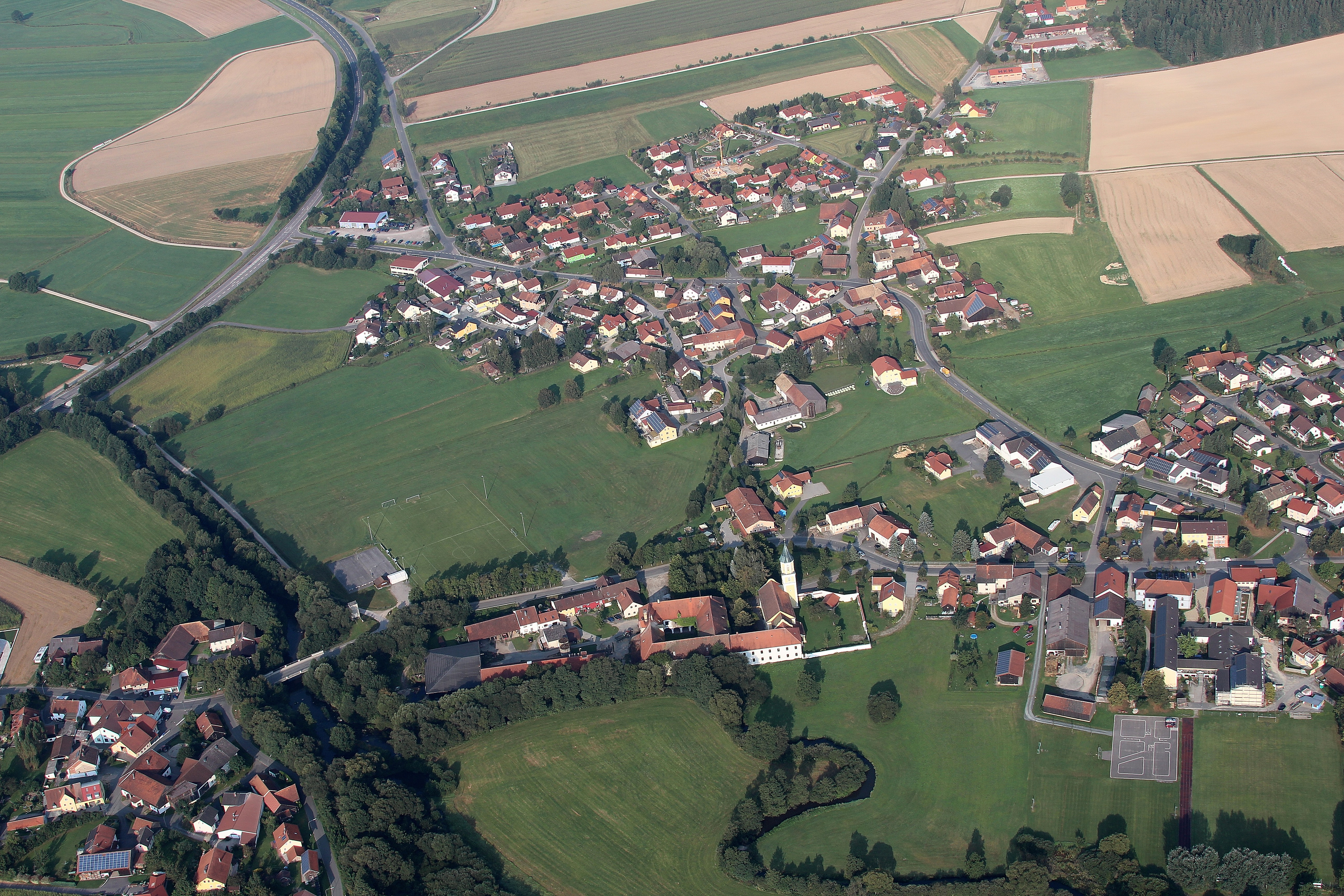
- Aerial view

- Coat of arms

- Location of Schönthal within Cham district
- Interactive map of Schönthal
- Location within Germany Location within Bavaria
- Coordinates: 49°21′N 12°36′E
- Country: Germany
- State: Bavaria
- Admin. region: Oberpfalz
- District: Cham

Government
  - Mayor (2020–26): Ludwig Wallinger (CSU)

Area
  - Total: 43.7 km^{2} (16.9 sq mi)
- Elevation: 453 m (1,486 ft)

Population (2025-12-31)
  - Total: 1,904
  - Density: 43.6/km^{2} (113/sq mi)
- Time zone: UTC+01:00 (CET)
  - Summer (DST): UTC+02:00 (CEST)
- Postal codes: 93488
- Dialling codes: 0 99 78
- Vehicle registration: CHA
- Website: www.gemeinde-schoenthal.de

Schönthal (German pronunciation: [ˈʃøːntaːl]) is a municipality in the district of Cham in Bavaria in Germany.

It was formerly the location of Schönthal Priory, secularised in 1802.

== History ==
=== Until the foundation of the community ===
Schönthal belonged to the Schönthal Monastery, founded before the year 1263.

In 1433, the Battle of Hiltersried took place near Schönthal, in which John of Palatinate-Neumarkt drove the Hussites out of the Upper Palatinate.

Monasteries, offices and the population often waged legal wars against each other. The nursing office Rötz v. Schönthal Monastery: April 10, 1794, September 11, 1794, January 1, 1795, January 22, 1795, July 22, 1798 (der Schmid v. the monastery), September 17, 1798 (community v. the monastery., When the Upper Palatinate regional courts were filled with former monastic judges in 1803, the monastic judge Merz von Schönthal, among others, could not be taken over. Reason: "inept subjects".

The place was later part of the Electorate of Bavaria and formed a closed Hofmark of the monastery, which was dissolved in 1802 in the course of secularization.
