= Siege of Helsingborg (1368–1369) =

Siege in Helsingborg between Swedish, Hanseatic and Danish forces

- Part of the Danish-Hanseatic War (1361–1370)
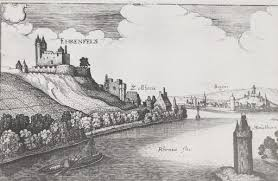
- Medieval Helsingborg with the fortress of Kärnan in 1658, by Samuel von Pufendorf
Date	Summer 1368 – September 1369
Location	Helsingborg, Scania, Denmark (present-day Sweden) 56°03′N 12°43′E
Result	Sueco–Hanseatic victory
Territorial changes	Helsingborg occupied by the Hanseatic League and Sweden

Belligerents
Hanseatic League; Sweden	Denmark

Commanders and leaders
Bruno Warendorp; Thomas Morkerken (History of Sweden (800–1521)) Albert I (History of Sweden (800–1521)) Heinrich	(Medieval Denmark) Fikke Moltke (surrendered) (Medieval Denmark) Hartvig Kale (surrendered)

Units involved
Unknown	(Medieval Denmark) Helsingborg garrison

Strength
1,100 men	Unknown

Casualties and losses
Unknown	Unknown

The siege of Helsingborg (Danish: belejringen af Helsingborg, Swedish: belägringen av Helsingborg) was a siege of the then-Danish city of Helsingborg between 1368 and 1369 during the Danish–Hanseatic War (1361–1370). Despite withstanding many sieges, Helsingborg would capitulate to the Hanseatic League.

== Background ==
The strong fortress of Helsingborg was in 1362 attacked by the Hanseatic League, though the invaders would be defeated and retreat after the Battle of Helsingborg. The battle was a military disaster for the Hanseatic League and made Valdemar IV of Denmark more powerful than ever. Subsequently, an alliance-confederation of 77 cities would merge with goal to defeat Denmark in 1367.

== Sieges ==
Already at the outbreak of the war in 1367 the Swedish king, Albert, would besiege the fortress, yet would retreat after it proved unsuccessful. Later the Swedes went to the Danish Isles taking Nykøbing and Stege, in which at their return to Sweden, they likely besieged Helsingborg again.

In 1369 the Hanseatic League would put all their effort into taking Helsingborg together with Albert of Sweden's son, Henrik. At Helsingborg, the fortress was run by Fikke Moltke and Hartig Kale. All the Hanseatic forces seem to be commanded by Bruno von Warendorp and Thomas Morkerken. The Hanseatic leaders would spread rumours that their army was larger than it was in reality. 2200 men were rumoured to be the number of the besieging force, while in reality, it was half of that. The rumours spread great havoc in the city, and on a Hanseatic meeting in Lübeck on 12 July 1369, it was already a common opinion that the city could not last much longer. Eight days later, on 21 July, the garrison gave up, and Fikke Moltke and Hartvig Kale made an agreement with the besiegers.

In the agreement, the Danish were to surrender the city on 8 September, unless King Valdemar and his helpers in the meanwhile would kick out all foreign forces in Denmark, or unless Mecklenburg and the Hanseatic League would leave the Confederation of Cologne. These two conditions were never fulfilled and the castle would surrender in September 1369.

== Aftermath ==
The fall of Helsingborg was felt as a great tragedy all over Denmark, and rumours were even spreading that Valdemar was prepared to retake it. The Hanseatic army continued down to Lindholmen Castle, which would also be besieged, however, this attack would fail for the Hanseatic League. Nevertheless, peace negotiations began and soon the Treaty of Stralsund was signed ending the war.

== See also ==
- Siege of Lindholmen – Siege between the Hanseatic League and Denmark
- Kärnan – Medieval tower in Helsingborg
- Siege of Copenhagen (1368) – Siege and looting of Copenhagen by Hanseatic forces in 1368
- Siege of Kolding (1368–1369) – Siege in Denmark, 1369

== Works cited ==
- Reisnert, Anders (2015). The Siege and Storm of Lindholmen during the Second Hanseatic War (1368-1369) (PDF). Sweden: DR. RUDOLF HABELT GMBH • BONN.
- Reinhardt, Christian (1880). Valdemar Atterdag og hans Kongegjerning (in Danish). Gad.
- Frederick, Peter (1826). Historie af Danmark (in Danish). Jens Hostrup Schulz. p. 613.
- Danmarks riges historie: 1241-1481 af Kr. Erslev (in Danish). Gyldendalske boghandel. 1907.
