= Siege of Lindholmen =

Siege between the Hanseatic League and Denmark

Coordinates: 55°29′49″N 13°17′54″E

- Part of the Danish-Hanseatic War (1361–1370)
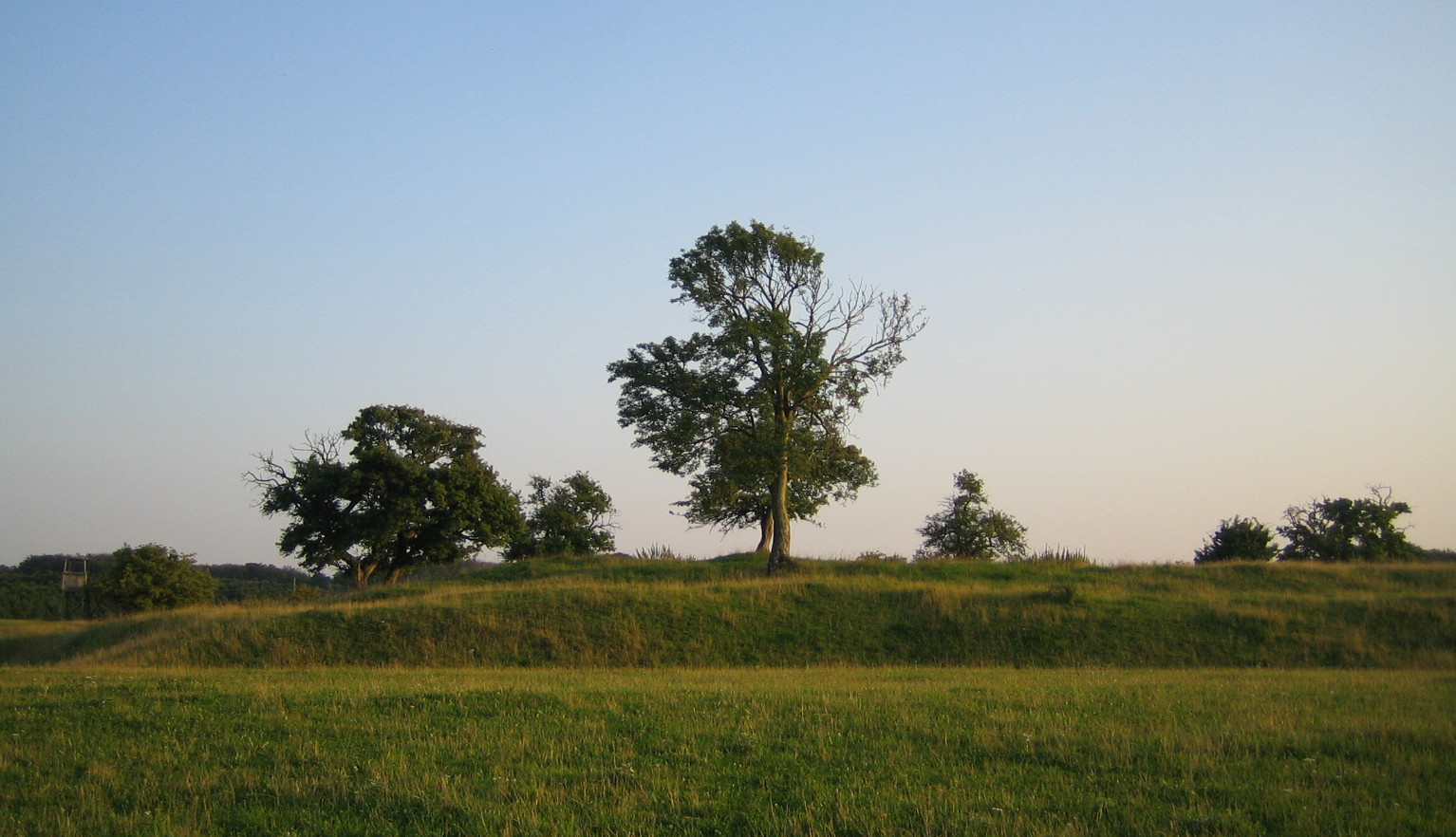
- Ruins of Lindholmen Castle, Scania (2005)
Date	Spring 1368 – 24 August 1369
Location	Lindholmen Castle, Scania, (then Denmark
Result	Danish victory
Territorial changes	Swedish and Hanseatic retreat

Belligerents
Hanseatic League; Sweden	Denmark

Commanders and leaders
Bruno Warendorp † (History of Sweden (800–1521)) Albert I	(Medieval Denmark) Peder Nilsen

Units involved
Unknown	(Medieval Denmark) Lindholmen garrison

Strength
1,100 men	Unknown (Note: It is unknown how big the garrison at Lindholmen was at the time of the siege, but it was sufficiently large for a solid defense of the castle)

Casualties and losses
Great losses	Unknown

The siege of Lindholmen (Danish: Belejringen af Lindholmen) was a siege of the former Danish castle of Lindholmen in Scania during the Danish-Hanseatic War of 1361 – 1370 between Sueco–Hanseatic and Danish forces. The siege ended in a Danish victory: the Hanseatic leader Bruno Warendorp was killed, and the siege was subsequently lifted.

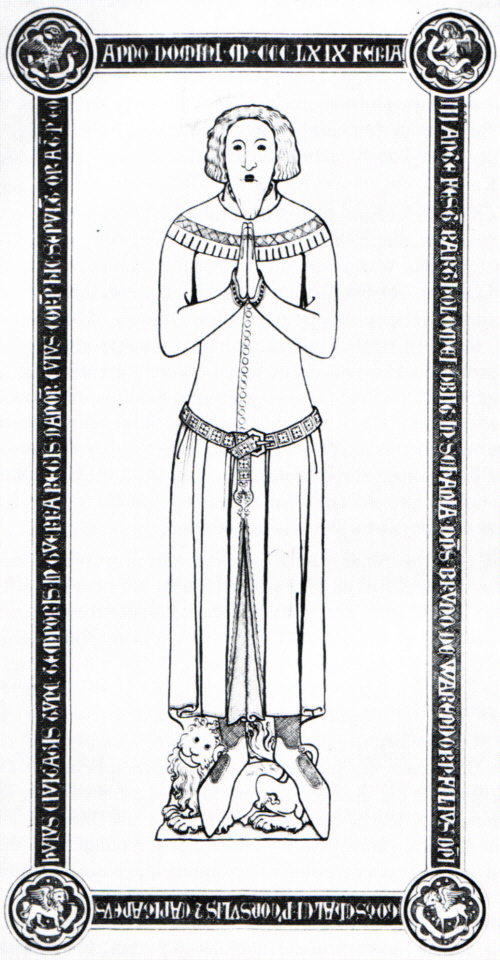
Bruno von Warendorp. Mayor of Lübeck. Drawing of his gravestone in Lübeck's St. Mary's Church.

== Background ==
In 1362 the Hanseatic League suffered a total military disaster at Helsingborg, leaving Valdemar IV of Denmark stronger than ever. In November 1367, 77 members of the Hanseatic diet held in Cologne, decided to form a confederation to attack Denmark. The confederation was supported by Count Adolf of Holstein and Albert, King of Sweden. The war began when King Albert invaded Scania, quickly taking cities like Falsterbo, Ystad, and Lund.

== Siege ==
On 14 August 1369, a troop of 1,000 men under the command of Bruno von Warendorp arrived in Höllviken. The next day the troops moved to the castle of Lindholmen to reinforce Albert of Sweden, who had been besieging the town since Spring 1368. When Bruno reached Lindholmen he acquainted himself with the tactical situation. He found out that the siege had so far been managed well, and that the castle could surrender quickly.

Small-scale attacks may have been initiated before the main attack, nevertheless, the main attack on the castle came on 24 August. However, the attack was repulsed and Bruno was killed during the attack. The Hanseatic soldiers ended the siege after the attack and withdrew from Lindholmen, as did Albert and the Swedish troops.

== Aftermath ==
The Hanseatic and Swedish defeat at Lindholmen did though not have any significance for the outcome of the war. At the Peace of Stralsund in 1371 the Hanseatid were able to dictate their control over the market area, though the Danish crown still controlled Lindholmen and could thus cause unease with the new rulers of the area.

== See also ==
- Siege of Copenhagen (1368) – Siege and looting of Copenhagen by Hanseatic forces in 1368
- Battle of Helsingborg (1362) – 1362 Danish victory
- Danish–Hanseatic rivalry – Medieval commercial and political rivalry between the Hanseatic League and Denmark
- Siege of Helsingborg (1368–1369) – Siege in Helsingborg between Swedish, Hanseatic and Danish forces

== Bibliography ==
- Reisnert, Anders (2015). The Siege and Storm of Lindholmen during the Second Hanseatic War (1368-1369) (PDF). Sweden: DR. RUDOLF HABELT GMBH • BONN.
- Reinhardt, Christian (1880). Valdemar Atterdag og hans Kongegjerning (in Danish). Gad. p. 443.
- Stearns, Peter (2001). The Encyclopedia of World History: Ancient, Medieval, and Modern, Chronologically Arranged. Houghton Mifflin Harcourt. p. 265.
