= Siege of Vordingborg =

Siege between the Hanseatic League and Denmark between 1368–1370

Coordinates: 55°00′26″N 11°54′45″E

- Part of the Danish–Hanseatic War (1361–1370)
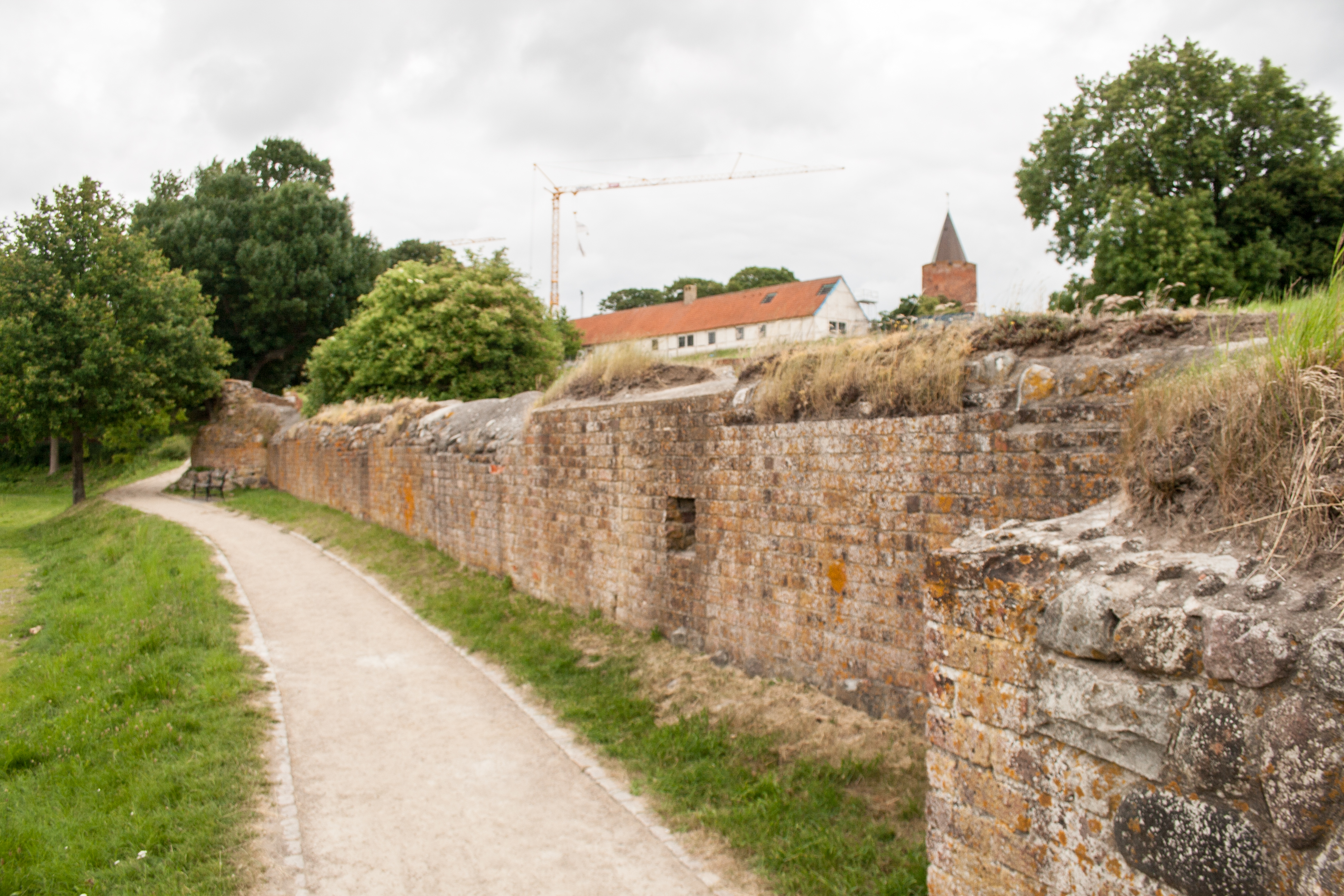
- Remnants of Vordingborg Castle (2013)
Date	1368–1370
Location	Vordingborg, Denmark
Result	Danish victory

Belligerents
Hanseatic League	Denmark

Commanders and leaders
Unknown	(Medieval Denmark) Hans Tyrbagh

Units involved
Unknown	(Medieval Denmark) Vordingborg garrison (Medieval Denmark) Relief force

Strength
Unknown	Unknown

Casualties and losses
Many imprisoned	Unknown

The siege of Vordingborg (Danish: Belejringen af Vordingborg) was a siege between the Hanseatic and Danish forces at Vordingborg, Zealand during the Danish–Hanseatic War (1361–1370). The Danes managed to defend Vordingborg for two years until peace was settled at Stralsund.

== Background ==
The Hanseatic League suffered a total military disaster at Helsingborg against Denmark in 1362, making Valdemar IV of Denmark stronger than ever. In November 1367, 77 members of the Hanseatic diet held in Cologne, decided to form a confederation to attack Denmark.

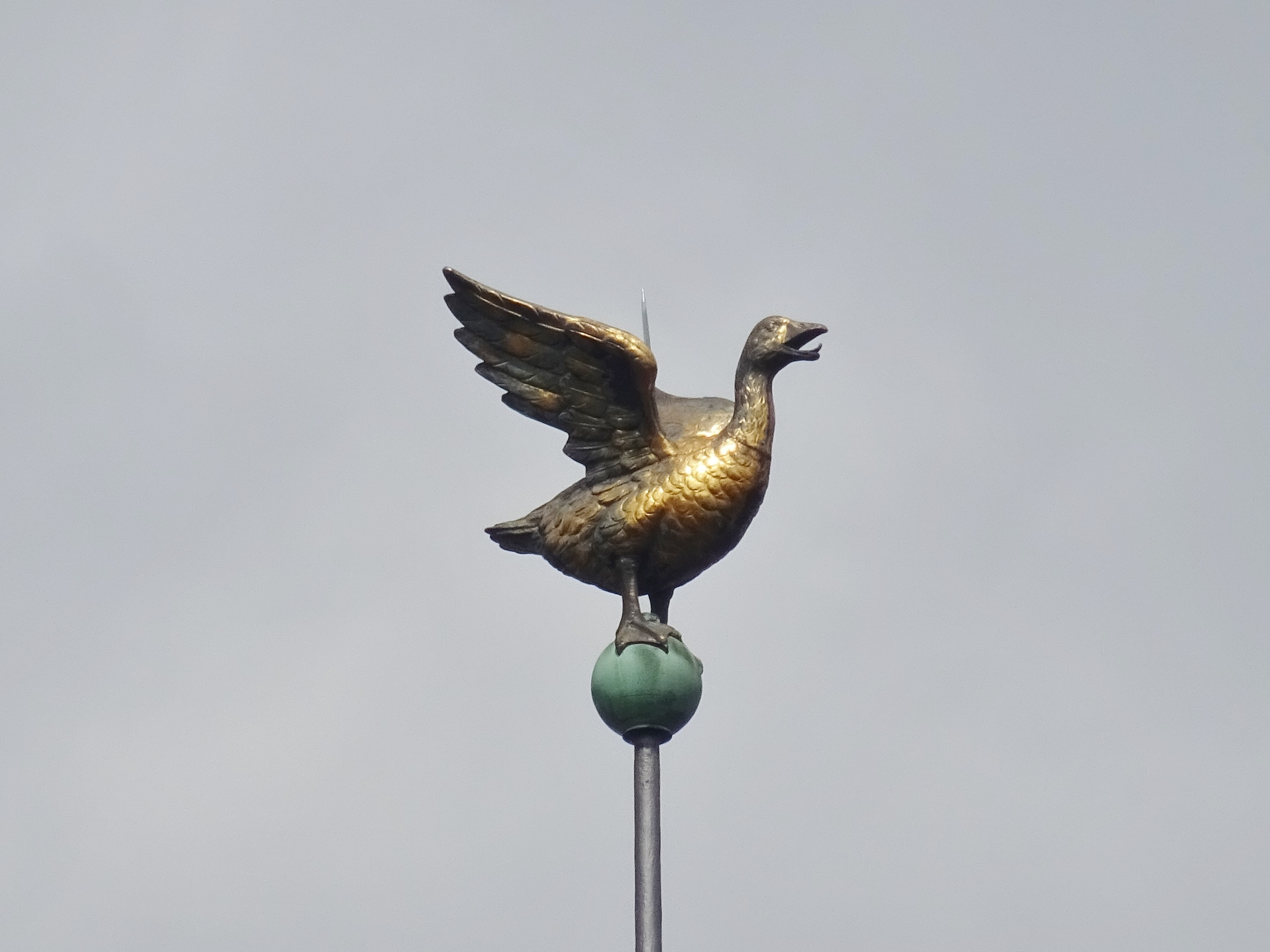
The golden goose at the top of the Goose Tower. A symbol of the Danish–Hanseatic rivalry in the 14th century.

At the time of these conflicts, Vordingborg Castle was one of Denmark's biggest castles and Valdemar IV even used it as a residence. The biggest of the castle's towers was the Goose Tower (Gåsetårnet), which is said to have gotten its name after a golden goose with which Valdemar VI crowned the tower. The goose symbolized the Hanseatic League, Valdemar's main enemy. He referred to the league as a bunch of squawking but otherwise harmless geese.

== Siege ==
At the outbreak of the war, the Hanseatic League would besiege Vordingborg, and a two-year-long siege would occur. During the siege, the fort's commander, Hans Tyrbagh, got reinforcements from Valdemar IV. This was unbeknownst to the Hanseatic forces, and Tyrbagh made a sortie and took many Hanseatic troops as hostage. As a result, the two parties agreed that the Germans would retreat in return for the hostages. However this was never fulfilled, since the Hanseatic forces did not fully retreat, because of new reinforcements.

Seeing this, Tyrbagh pretended to surrender the castle and demanded that the Germans should send some of their commanders into the castle, to discuss the matters. Inside the castle, Tyrbagh held his promise and handed the keys over to the Germans. However, the Hanseatic commanders would quickly be surrounded and imprisoned. Seeing this, the Hanseatic forces would retreat and abandon the siege.

== Aftermath ==
In addition to the failed siege of Vordingborg, the Zealandic castles of Korsør, Holbæk, Søborg, Gurre, and Jungshoved also held out to the end of the war.

== See also ==
- Battle of Helsingborg (1362) – 1362 Danish victory
- Danish–Hanseatic rivalry – Medieval commercial and political rivalry between the Hanseatic League and Denmark
- Gurre Castle – Ruins of a royal castle located in North Zealand, Denmark
- Siege of Copenhagen (1368) – Siege and looting of Copenhagen by Hanseatic forces in 1368
- Siege of Kalundborg – 1341 siege in Denmark

== Works cited ==
- Reisnert, Anders (2015). The Siege and Storm of Lindholmen during the Second Hanseatic War (1368-1369) (PDF). Sweden: DR. RUDOLF HABELT GMBH • BONN.
- Reinhardt, Christian (1880). Valdemar Atterdag og hans Kongegjerning (in Danish). Gad. p. 434.
- Barfod, Povl (1885). Danmarks historie fra 1319 til 1536 (in Danish). K. Schönberg. p. 134.
- Both, Ludvig (1871). Danmark: deel. Østifterne (in Danish). F. Wøldike. p. 211.
