= Siege of Nykøbing =

1368 siege in Denmark

Coordinates: 54°46′18″N 11°51′56″E

Siege of Nykøbing Castle
- Part of the Danish-Hanseatic War (1361–1370)
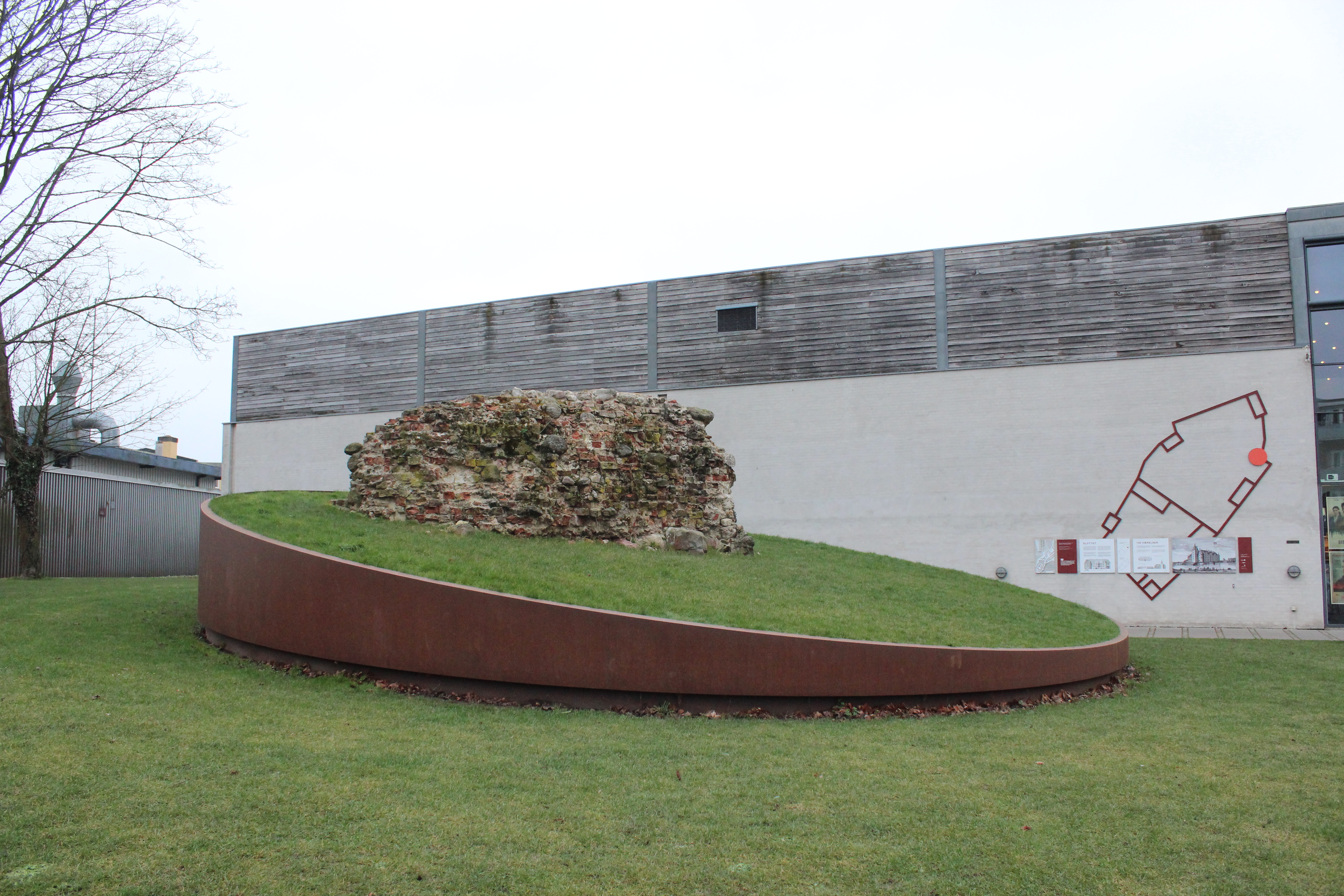
- Last remaining part of Nykøbing Castle (2018)
Date	? – 15 August 1368
Location	Nykøbing Castle, Falster, Denmark
Result	Swedish victory
Territorial changes	Falster falls into Swedish rule

Belligerents
Sweden; Hanseatic League	Denmark

Commanders and leaders
(History of Sweden (800–1521)) Heinrich	(Medieval Denmark) Henning Aldestorf (surrendered)

Units involved
Unknown	(Medieval Denmark) Nykøbing garrison

Strength
Unknown	Unknown

Casualties and losses
Unknown	Unknown

The siege of Nykøbing or the siege of Nykøbing Castle (Danish: Belejringen af Nykøbing Slot), was a siege of Nykøbing Castle, Falster, between Danish and Swedish forces during the Danish-Hanseatic War (1361–1370). The siege ended in a Swedish victory, though the Danes were able to achieve a good instrument of surrender.

== Background ==
In 1367 the Confederation of Cologne together with Holstein and Sweden attacked Denmark. Albert, King of Sweden made successful campaigns in Scania taking Lund, Ystad, and Simrishamn. From here, Albert promised to make an expedition to the Danish Isles, although he could not participate because of wounds or illness. Instead, Albert's son, Duke Henrik, would lead the combined Swedish-Hanseatic expedition.

== Expedition and siege ==
The first goal was the island of Møn, in which the city of Stege fell. Hereafter the Swedes moved to Falster, where they began besieging Nykøbing Castle. The leader of the castle, Henning Aldestorf, defended the castle bravely, although he would surrender on 15 August. However, because of his brave actions, Duke Henrik allowed him to keep the castle if reinforcements from Valdemar IV of Denmark came before the next St. Michael's Day. If reinforcements had not come until then, then the Mecklenburgian Fikke Moltke would have taken over the castle as a subject of Albert of Sweden.

== Aftermath ==
Presumably, Danish reinforcements did not come, because in 1370 Fikke Moltke acknowledged his mortgage to Albert of Sweden. With the presumed takeover of Falster, the Swedish troops moved to raid Lolland.

== See also ==
- Siege of Vordingborg – Siege between the Hanseatic League and Denmark between 1368–1370
- Siege of Copenhagen (1368) – Siege and looting of Copenhagen by Hanseatic forces in 1368
- Siege of Lindholmen – Siege between the Hanseatic League and Denmark
- Valdemar Atterdag's invasion of Gotland – 1361 Danish victory over the Hanseatic League

== Works cited ==
- Reinhardt, Christian (1880). Valdemar Atterdag og hans Kongegjerning (in Danish). Gad. p. 443.
- Lundbye, Peter (1939). Danmarks riges genopretter, skildret i ny historisk belysning efter de samtidige kilders beretning (in Danish). E. Munkagaard.
- Lerdam, Henrik (1996). Danske len og lensmænd 1370-1443 (in Danish). Museum Tusculanum.
- Reisnert, Anders (2015). The Siege and Storm of Lindholmen during the Second Hanseatic War (1368-1369) (PDF). Sweden: DR. RUDOLF HABELT GMBH • BONN.
