= Bruno von Warendorp =

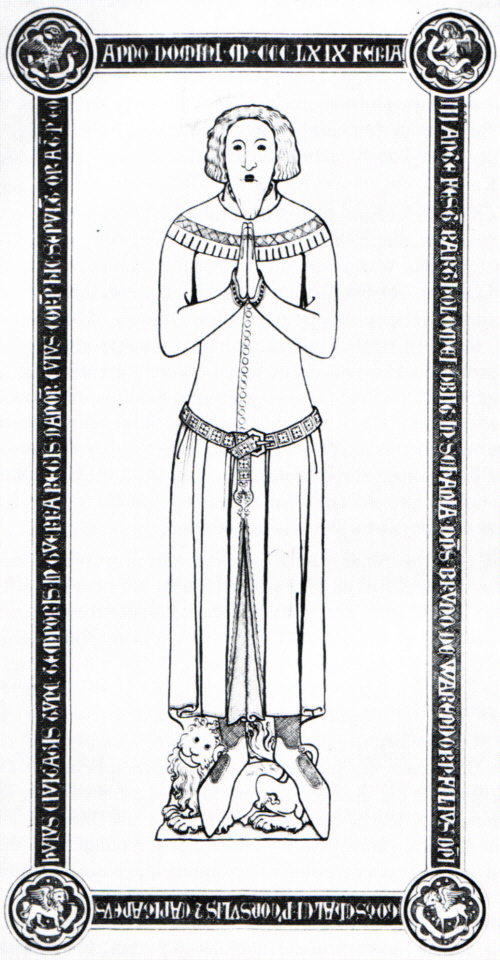
Bruno von Warendorp

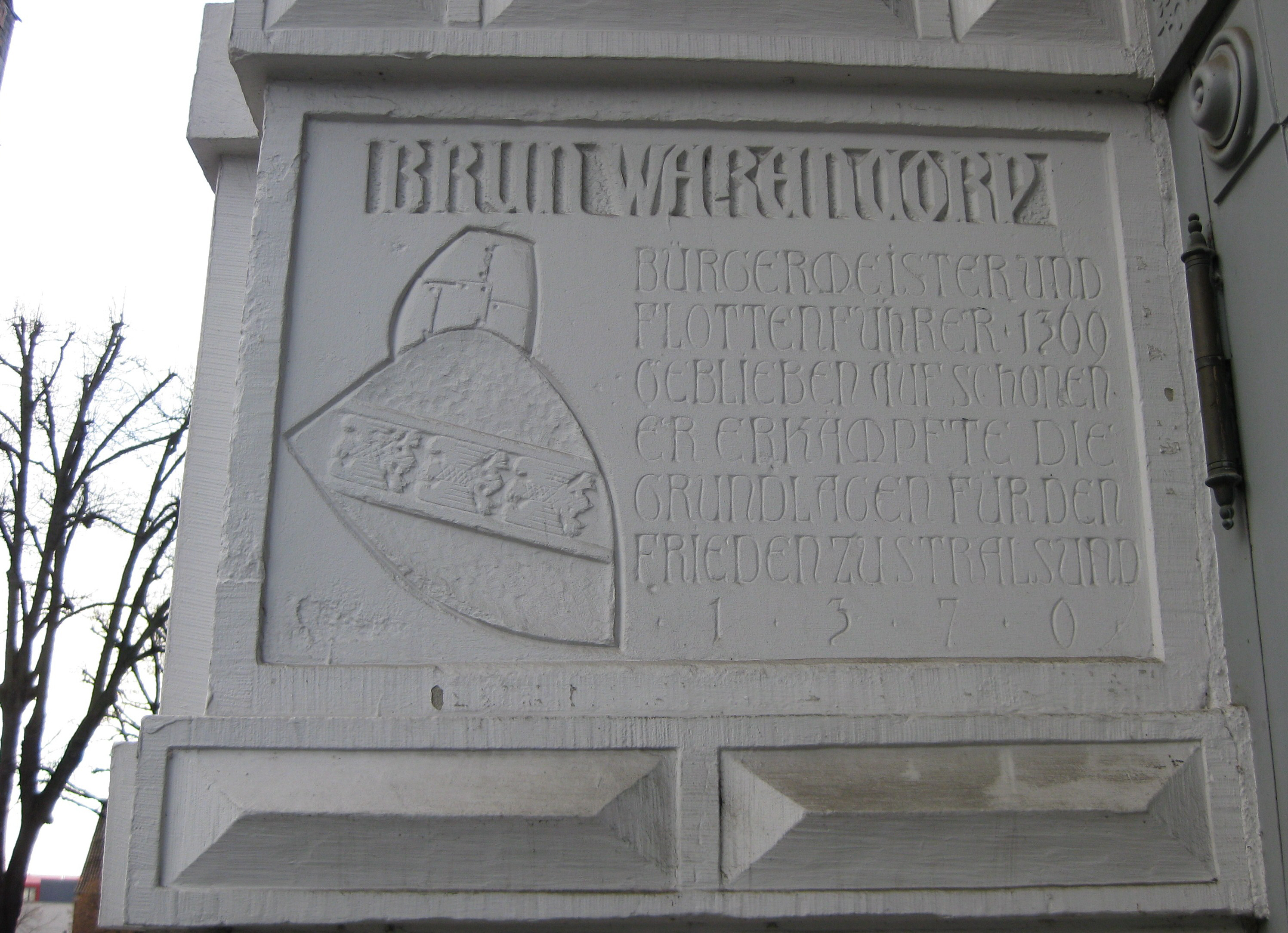
Plaque to Bruno on the Buddenbrookhaus, later made famous by Thomas Mann - both Bruno and his father lived there.

Bruno von Warendorp or Brun Warendorp (died 21 August 1369, Schonen) was alderman and mayor of Lübeck, where he was born.

The son of Gottschalk Warendorp (), Bruno became a ratsherr in 1366 and mayor of the Hanseatic cities in 1367. In 1368 he led Lübeck's contingent in the Confederation force which marched against Waldemar IV of Denmark. He died after Lübeck's unsuccessful siege of Lindholmen, contrary to the popular belief that he died during the Siege of Helsingborg. Helsingborg's capture laid the foundations for the Peace of Stralsund the following year.

== Bibliography ==
- Ehrhardt, Rafael (2001). Familie und Memoria in der Stadt. Eine Fallstudie zu Lübeck im Spätmittelalter (PhD thesis). Georg–August–Universität Göttingen. doi:10.53846/goediss-1228. Full text with a prosopography of the councillor-families of Alen, Darsow, Geverdes, Segeberg and Warendorf.
- Emil Ferdinand Fehling: Lübeckische Ratslinie, Lübeck 1925, Nr. 394.
- Reisnert, Anders (2015). The Siege and Storm of Lindholmen during the Second Hanseatic War (1368-1369) (PDF). Sweden: DR. RUDOLF HABELT GMBH • BONN. pp. 205–213.
