= Helsingborg (disambiguation) =

Helsingborg is a town in Sweden.

Helsingborg may also refer to:

- Helsingborg BBK, a basketball club
- Helsingborgs IF, a football club
- Helsingborgs HC, an ice hockey club
- HSwMS Helsingborg, several ships of the Swedish Navy

== See also ==
- Battle of Helsingborg (disambiguation)
