= Treaty of Bergen =

1450 treaty between Norway and Denmark

Bergenstraktaten (Norwegian)
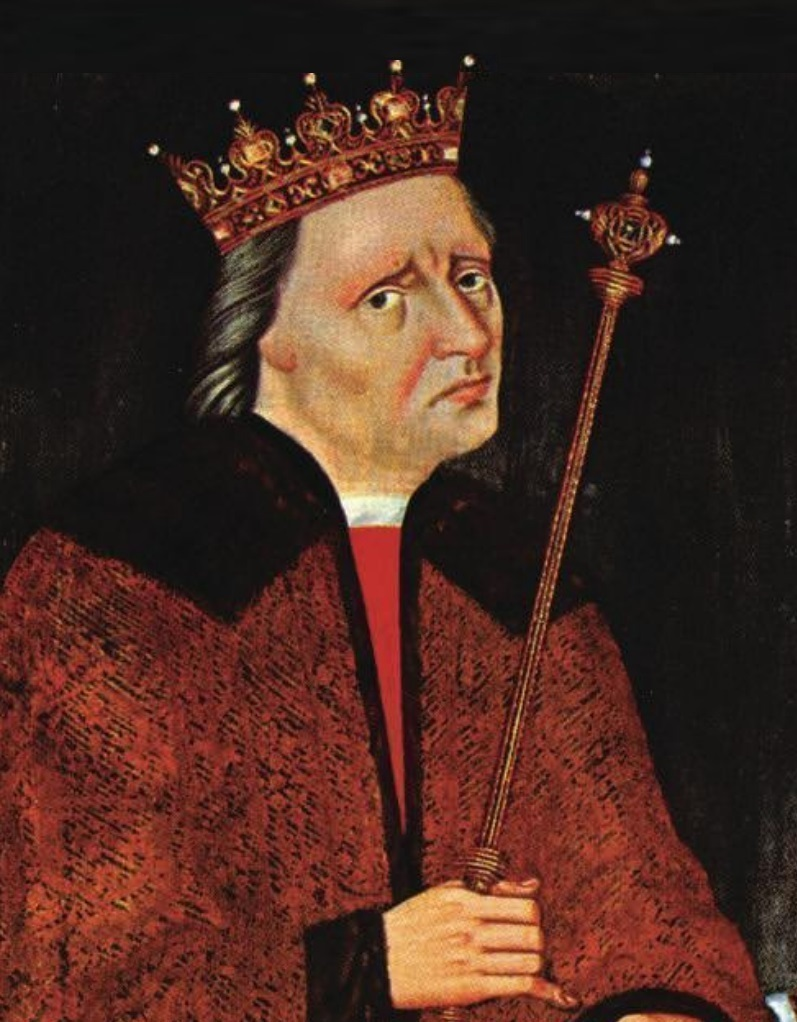
- Christian I was elected King of Denmark and Norway in the treaty.
- Type: Union treaty
- Context: Kalmar Union
- Signed: 29 August 1450
- Location: Bergen, Norway
- Expiration: 1536/1537 (Reformation in Denmark–Norway)
- Parties: Norway; Denmark

Treaty of Bergen, signed on 29 August 1450 in Bergen, between Norway and Denmark. The agreement was in many ways a continuation of the Kalmar Union founded in 1397, between Norway, Denmark and Sweden, while Norway and Denmark had been in a personal union with a common king since 1380 (with interruptions). The Bergen Treaty stipulated that Norway and Denmark should belong together forever. The choice of king was to be made jointly, and the first king elected was Christian I, from the House of Oldenburg. Furthermore, the kingdoms were to be equal and self-governed. The latter meant that the Norwegian National Council continued its work of governing the country, so that Norway retained a large degree of independence. The treaty lasted for 87 years, and ended when king Christian III in 1537 did a Coup d'état, and made Norway a puppet kingdom.

The House of Oldenburg would remain on the Norwegian throne until 1814, and the Danish throne until 1863.
