= Battle of Helsingborg (disambiguation) =

The Battle of Helsingborg was a 1710 battle between Denmark and Sweden, part of the Great Northern War.

The Battle of Helsingborg may also refer to:

- Battle of Helsingborg (1362), part of the Danish–German War, fought between Denmark and the Hanseatic League
- Siege of Helsingborg (1368–1369), Siege in Helsingborg between Swedish, Hanseatic and Danish forces
- Battle of Helsingborg (1535), during the Count's Feud
