= Henning Podebusk =

Danish nobleman

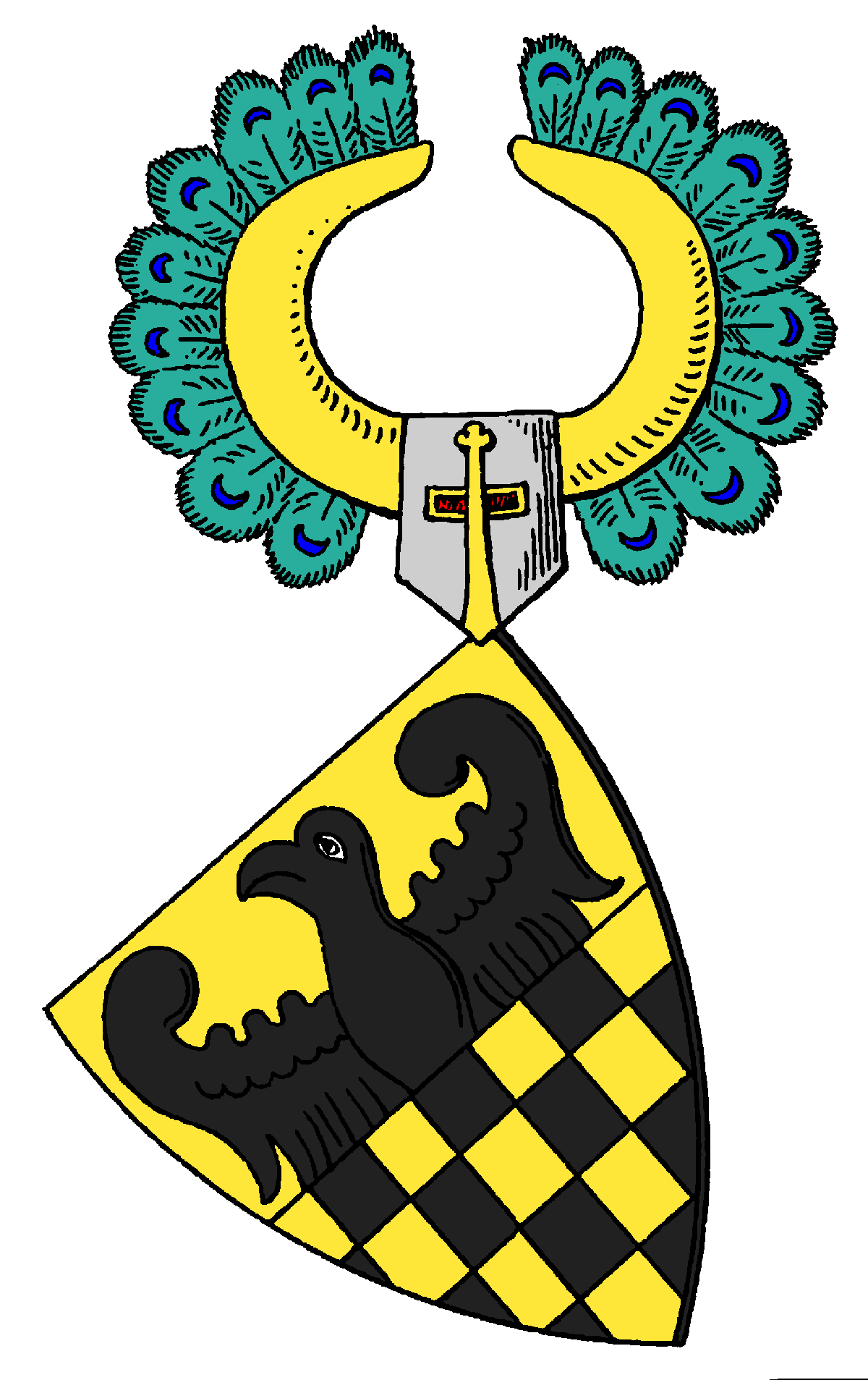
Putbus-St-Wappen.

Henning Podebusk or Putbus (before 1350 – c. 1388) was a German-Slavic statesman, the last drost of Denmark. (Note: German: Herr Henning II zu Putbus) He served under King Valdemar IV, King Oluf II, and Queen Margaret I, and he was the de facto ruler of Denmark from 1368 to 1370. Podebusk, whose personal character is unknown, is now considered one of the most important Danish statesmen of the Middle Ages. His political views seem to have been just as cynical and power-centred as that of his royal masters, but perhaps he was an even better diplomat. By his death the office of drost was abolished, probably because he had shown how powerful it might be.

== Biography ==
Podebusk belonged to a German-Slavic family of magnates related to the princes of Rügen. The family was based in Putbus, which had been Danish before 1325. Nothing is known of his youth. He first appeared in Danish history in 1350, as he met Valdemar IV in Northern Germany and was taken into Danish service. During the next 15 years he became one of the king's most important and loyal officials in both foreign and domestic relations.

In 1365, he was appointed drost (prime minister) of Denmark, and he showed his diplomatic ability during the war 1367–1370 against the powerful Hanseatic League and its allied Confederation of Cologne. When Valdemar was pressed to leave Denmark in 1368, Podebusk was appointed the de facto ruler, and set about ending the war with the League. He cut his losses in the war, and split the enemy alliance by agreeing an unfavourable separate peace with the Hansa in the Treaty of Stralsund. After the war he took part in the king's legal settlement with the magnate rebellionists in Denmark and during the next years he managed to sabotage much of the Hansa's economic advantages from the peace.

After the death of Valdemar in 1375, Podebusk played an important role as the protector of Danish royal interests, as he helped Valdemar's five-year-old grandson Oluf II ascend the throne in favour of candidates from the House of Mecklenburg. He damped the magnates' opposition by temporary concessions and repudiated foreign demands on the throne. Podebusk served as a councillor for Oluf's mother Margaret Valdemarsdaughter, and helped her ascend the throne as Queen Margaret I when Oluf died in 1387. No exact date of death is known, but his wife Gisela Podebusk was described as a widow in October 1388.

He married his distant relative Gisela Podebusk, from Denmark, whose mother Eufemia was the daughter of the last Danish count of Halland, according to medieval tales. His descendants played a modest role in Danish politics until 1660, then as magnates in Sweden, hereditary lord marshals of Pomerania, and elevated Princes of Putbus, ultimately in the kingdom of Prussia.
