= HSwMS Helsingborg =

Several ships of the Swedish Navy have been named HSwMS Helsingborg, named after the city of Helsingborg:

- Helsingborg (1749) was a ship launched in 1749
- HSwMS Hälsingborg (J13) was a Visby-class destroyer launched in 1943 and decommissioned in 1978
- HSwMS Helsingborg (K32) was a Visby-class corvette launched in 2003 and commissioned in 2006
