= Kalmar Union =

Personal union in Scandinavia

Kalmar Union Kalmarunionen
- 1397–1523
- The Kalmar Union, c. 1400
- Status: Personal union
- Capital: None (de jure); Copenhagen (de facto); 55°40′N 12°34′E
- Common languages: Official use: Middle Danish, Old Swedish, Middle Norwegian, Renaissance Latin; Also spoken: Middle Icelandic, Old Faroese, Norn, Greenlandic Norse, Middle Low German, Finnish, Sami, Greenlandic, Karelian
- Government: Personal union
- Monarch
  - 1397–1442^{a}: Eric of Pomerania (first)
  - 1513–1523^{b}: Christian II (last)
- Legislature: Riksråd and Herredag (one in each kingdom)
- Historical era: Late Middle Ages
  - Inception: 17 June 1397
  - Engelbrekt rebellion: 1434–1436
  - Stockholm Bloodbath: November 1520
  - Gustav Vasa elected as King of Sweden: 1523
  - Denmark–Norway was established: 1523
- Currency: Mark, Örtug, Norwegian penning, Swedish penning
Preceded by
Kingdom of Denmark
Kingdom of Norway
Kingdom of Sweden
Succeeded by
Denmark–Norway
Kingdom of Sweden
- 1. Margaret I ruled Denmark 1387–1412, Norway 1388–1389, and Sweden 1389–1412; 2. Christian II ruled Denmark and Norway 1513–1523; Sweden 1520–1521

The Kalmar Union (Note: Danish, Norwegian, and Swedish: Kalmarunionen; Finnish: Kalmarin unioni; Icelandic: Kalmarsambandið; Latin: Unio Calmariensis) was a personal union in Scandinavia, agreed upon at Kalmar in Sweden as designed by Queen Margaret I of Denmark. From 1397 to 1523, it joined under a single monarch the three kingdoms of Denmark, Sweden (then including much of present-day Finland), and Norway, together with Norway's maritime colonies (Note: Norway retained none of its prior possessions, but Christian I pledged the Northern Isles to Scotland as insurance for his daughter's dowry in 1468; the dowry was not paid, and the islands transferred to perpetual Scottish sovereignty in 1470. After the Union's dissolution, all remaining overseas possessions Norway brought into the Union became property of the Danish monarch, who retained ownership following the transfer of the Kingdom of Norway from the Danish crown to Swedish crown (discussed in further detail below) after the Napoleonic Wars.) (then including Iceland, Greenland, (Note: Nominal possession: Norway claimed suzerainty over the island prior to the Union's formation, but it had long since ceased exercising any administrative control over the European settlements there. No direct contact took place between Greenland and the Kalmar Union during the latter's existence.) the Faroe Islands, and the Northern Isles of Orkney and Shetland).

The union was not continuous. The countries retained separate legal and administrative systems, and in particular in Sweden, the union was from the middle of the fifteenth century often nominal, with actual power instead in the hands of the nobility. Gustav Vasa's election as King of Sweden on 6 June 1523, and his triumphant entry into Stockholm 11 days later, marked Sweden's final secession from the Kalmar Union. Frederick I formally renounced his claim to Sweden in 1524 at the Treaty of Malmö.

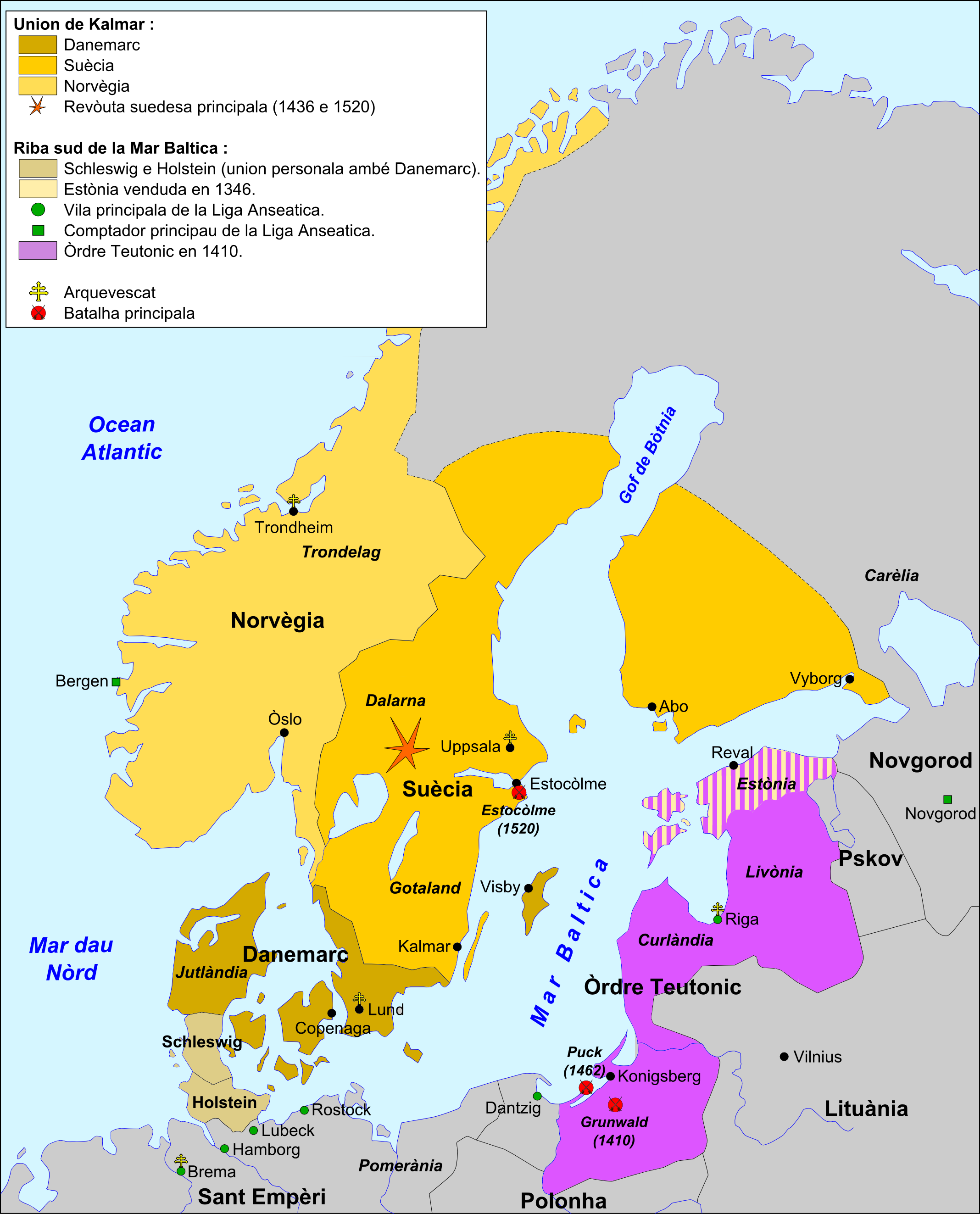
The Kalmar Union: Denmark, Sweden, Norway. But also Finland, Iceland, the Åland Islands, the Faroe Islands, Greenland, Svalbard, Jan Mayen, Orkney and Shetland. Along with Schleswig, Holstein, Lauenburg, Oldenburg, Pomerania, Estonia, Latvia, Lithuania and Königsberg

== History ==
=== Inception ===
The union was the work of Scandinavian aristocracy who sought to counter the influence of the Hanseatic League, a northern German trade league centered around the Baltic and North Seas. Denmark in particular was in a power struggle with the League and had recently suffered a humiliating defeat in the Danish-Hanseatic War (1361-1370) that allowed the League to become even more powerful. On the personal level, the union was achieved by Queen Margaret I of Denmark (1353–1412). She was a daughter of King Valdemar IV of Denmark and had married King Haakon VI of Norway and Sweden, who was the son of King Magnus IV of Sweden, Norway and Scania. Margaret succeeded in having her and Haakon's son Olaf recognized as heir to the throne of Denmark. In 1376, Olaf inherited the crown of Denmark from his maternal grandfather as King Olaf II, with his mother as guardian; when Haakon VI died in 1380, Olaf also inherited the crown of Norway.

Margaret became regent of Denmark and Norway when Olaf died in 1387, leaving her without an heir. She adopted her great-nephew Eric of Pomerania the same year. In 1388, Swedish nobles called upon her help against King Albert. After Margaret defeated Albert in 1389, her heir Eric was proclaimed King of Norway. Eric was subsequently elected King of Denmark and Sweden in 1396 under the banner of the House of Griffin. His coronation was held in Kalmar on 17 June 1397.

One main impetus for the union's formation was to block German expansion northward into the Baltic region. The main reason for its failure to survive was the perpetual struggle between the monarch, who wanted a strong unified state, and the Swedish and Danish nobility, which did not.

The Union lost territory when Orkney and Shetland were pledged by Christian I, in his capacity as King of Norway, as security against the payment of the dowry of his daughter Margaret, betrothed to James III of Scotland in 1468. The money was never paid, so in 1472 the Kingdom of Scotland annexed the islands.

=== Internal conflict ===
Diverging interests (especially the Swedish nobility's dissatisfaction with the dominant role played by Denmark and Holstein) gave rise to a conflict that hampered the union in several intervals starting in the 1430s. The Engelbrekt rebellion, which started in 1434, led to the overthrow of King Erik (in Denmark and Sweden in 1439, as well as Norway in 1442). The aristocracy sided with the rebels.

King Erik's foreign policy, in particular his conflict with the Hanseatic League, necessitated greater taxation and complicated exports of iron, which in turn may have precipitated the rebellion. Discontent with the nature of Erik's regime has also been cited as a motivating factor for the rebellion. Erik also lacked a standing army and had limited tax revenues.

The death of Christopher of Bavaria (who had no heirs) in 1448 ended a period in which the three Scandinavian kingdoms were uninterruptedly united for a lengthy period. Karl Knutsson Bonde ruled as king of Sweden (1448–1457, 1464–1465, and 1467–1470) and Norway (1449-1450). Christian of Oldenburg was king of Denmark (1448–1481), Norway (1450–1481) and Sweden (1457–1464). Karl and Christian fought over control of Sweden, Norway, and Denmark, leading Christian to seize Sweden from him from 1457 to 1464 before a rebellion led Karl to become king of Sweden again. When Karl died in 1470, Christian tried to become king of Sweden again, but was defeated by Sten Sture the Elder in the 1471 battle of Brunkeberg outside Stockholm.

After Karl's death, Sweden was mostly ruled by a series of "protectors of the realm" (riksföreståndare), with the Danish kings attempting to assert control. First of these protectors was Sten Sture, who kept Sweden under his control until 1497, when the Swedish nobility deposed him. A peasant rebellion led Sture to become regent of Sweden again in 1501. After his death, Sweden was ruled by Svante Nilsson (1504–1512) and then Svante's son Sten Sture the Younger (1512–1520). Sten Sture the Younger was killed in the 1520 Battle of Bogesund when the Danish king Christian II invaded Sweden with a large army. Subsequently, Christian II was crowned King of Sweden, and supporters of Sten Sture were executed en masse in the Stockholm Bloodbath.

==== Swedish War of Liberation ====
After the Stockholm Bloodbath, Gustav Vasa (whose father, Erik Johansson, was executed) travelled to Dalarna, where he organized a rebellion against Christian II. Vasa made an alliance with Lübeck and successfully conquered most of Sweden. He was elected King of Sweden in 1523, effectively ending the Kalmar Union. After the Northern Seven Years' War, the Treaty of Stettin (1570) saw Frederick II renounce all claims to Sweden.

=== End and aftermath ===
One of the union's last structures remained until 1536/1537, when the Danish Privy Council, in the aftermath of the Count's Feud, declared Norway a Danish province. In practice, Norway kept its status as a separate kingdom and its own laws, but its council and other central institutions were dissolved, and it became politically subordinate to Denmark. This Denmark–Norway union lasted nearly three centuries, until Norway was ceded to Sweden in 1814. The later Swedish–Norwegian union lasted until 1905, when Prince Carl of Denmark was elected king of independent Norway.

According to historian Sverre Bagge, the Kalmar Union was unstable for several reasons:

- The power of national aristocracies.
- The varied effects of the Kalmar Union's foreign policy on the three kingdoms. For example, attempted expansions into Northern Germany may have served Danish interests, but was costly to Swedes who had to pay higher taxes and were unable to export iron to the Hanseatic League.
- Geography complicated control of the union in the event of rebellion.
- The large territorial size of the union complicated control.
- Denmark was not strong enough to force Norway and Sweden to stay within the union.

== Gallery ==
=== Monarchs of the Kalmar Union ===
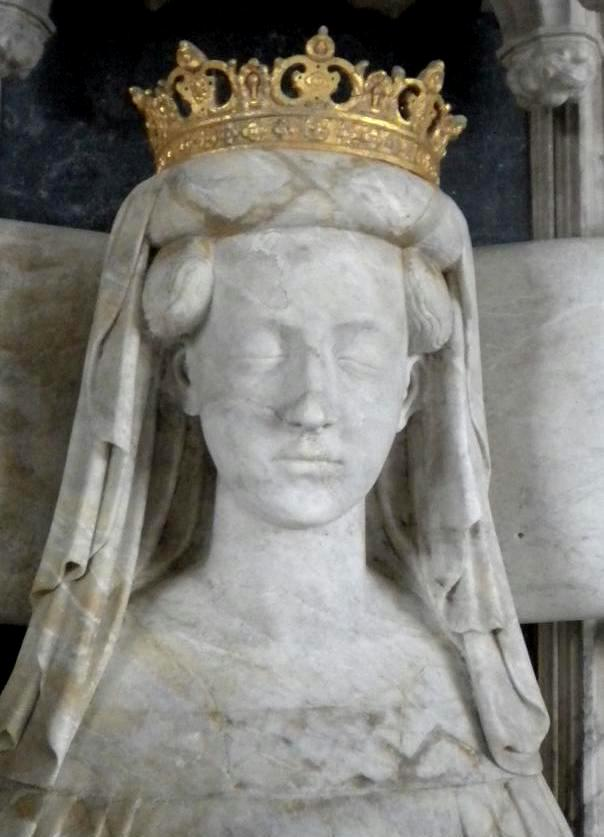
Margaret I of Denmark

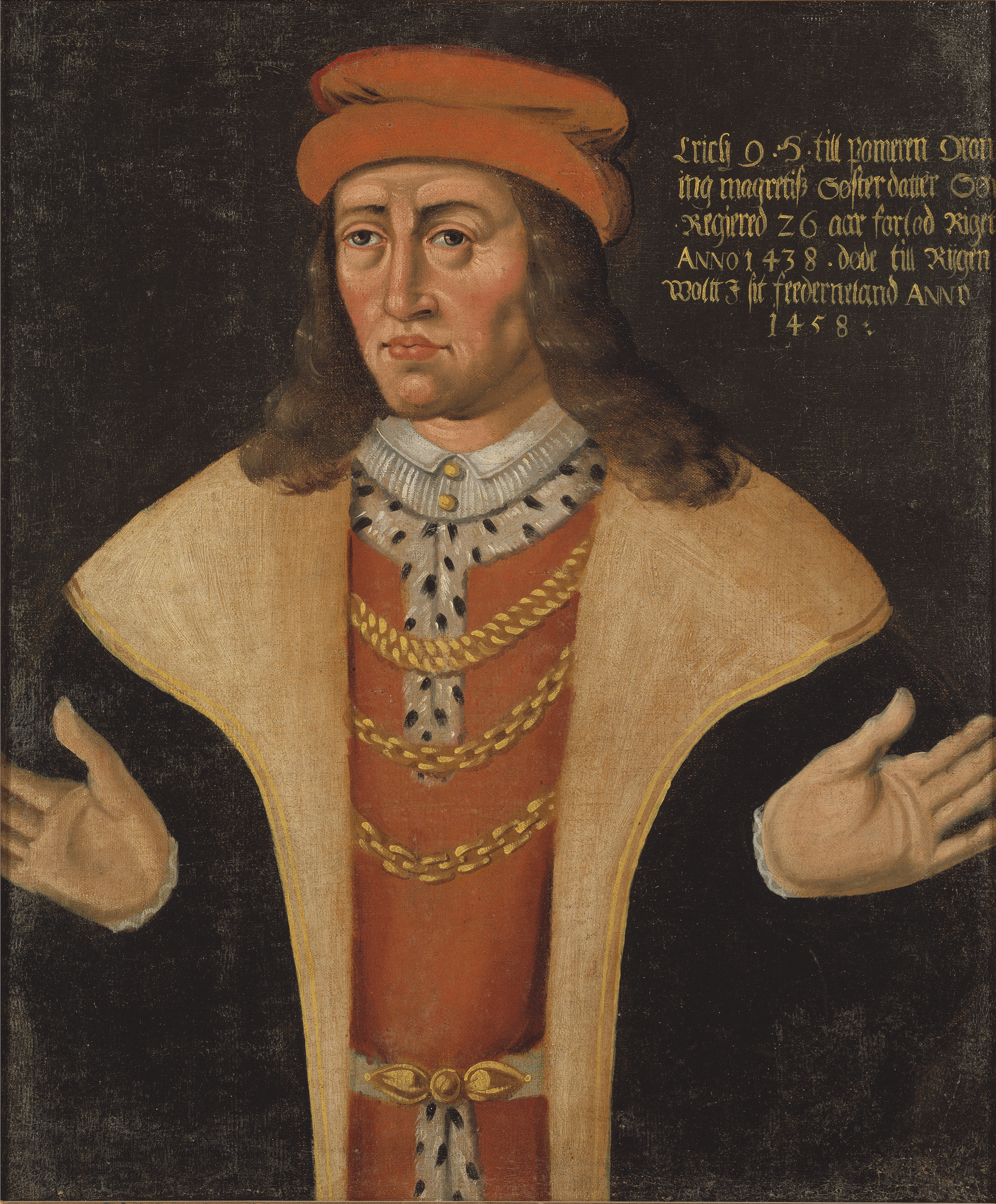
Erik of Pomerania

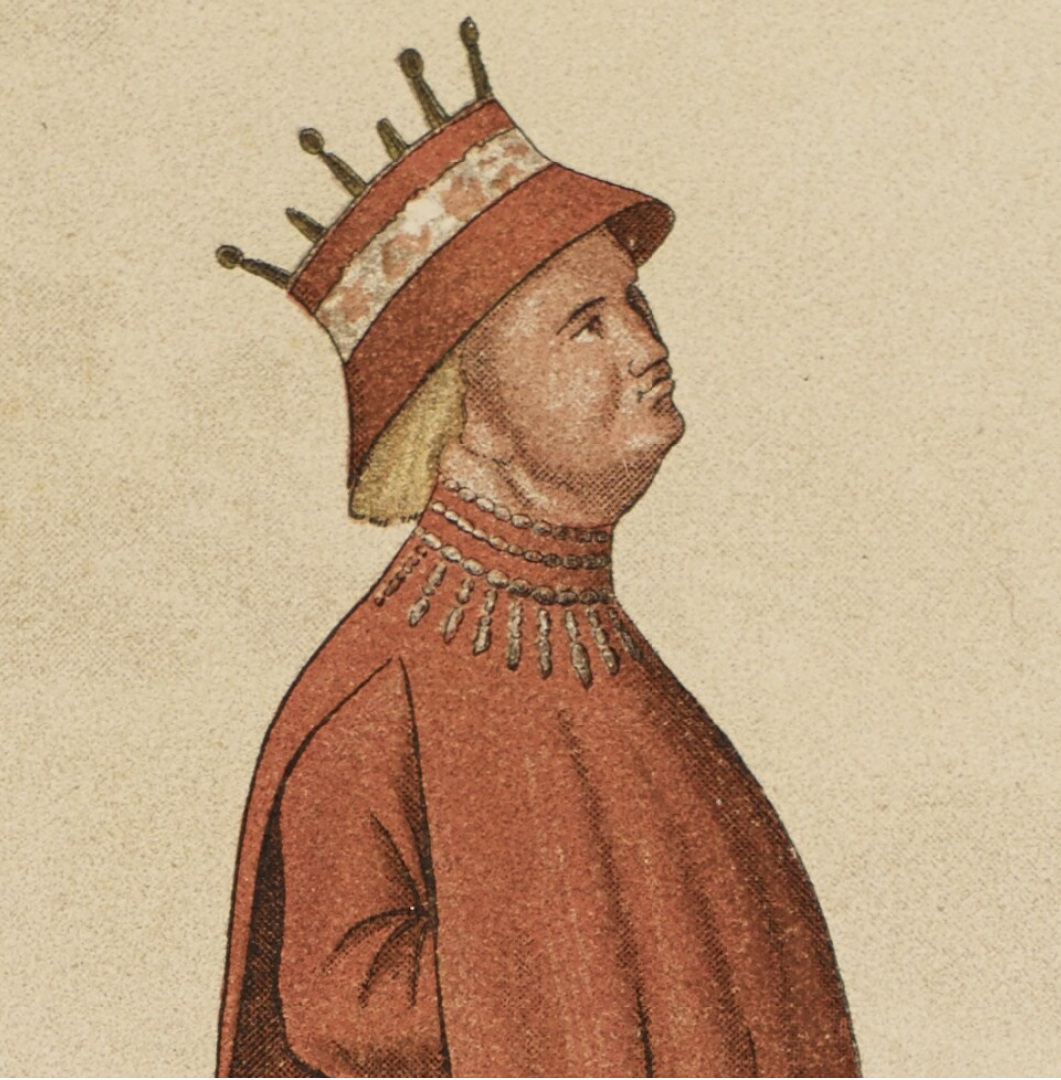
Christopher of Bavaria

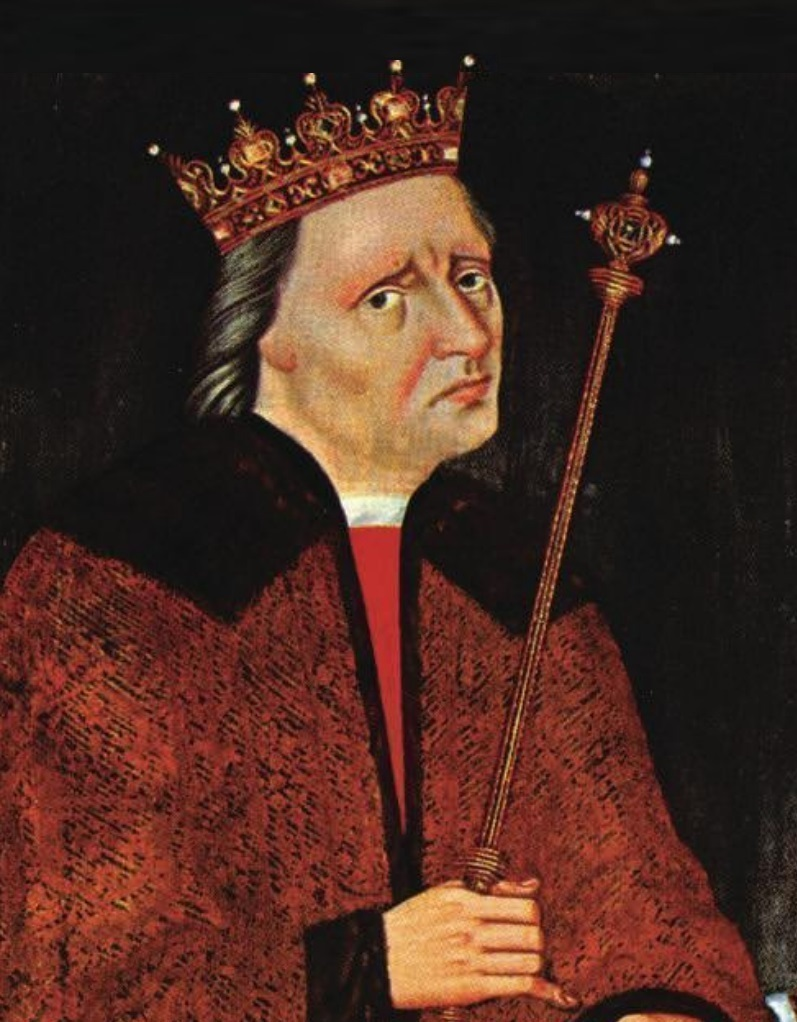
Christian I of Denmark

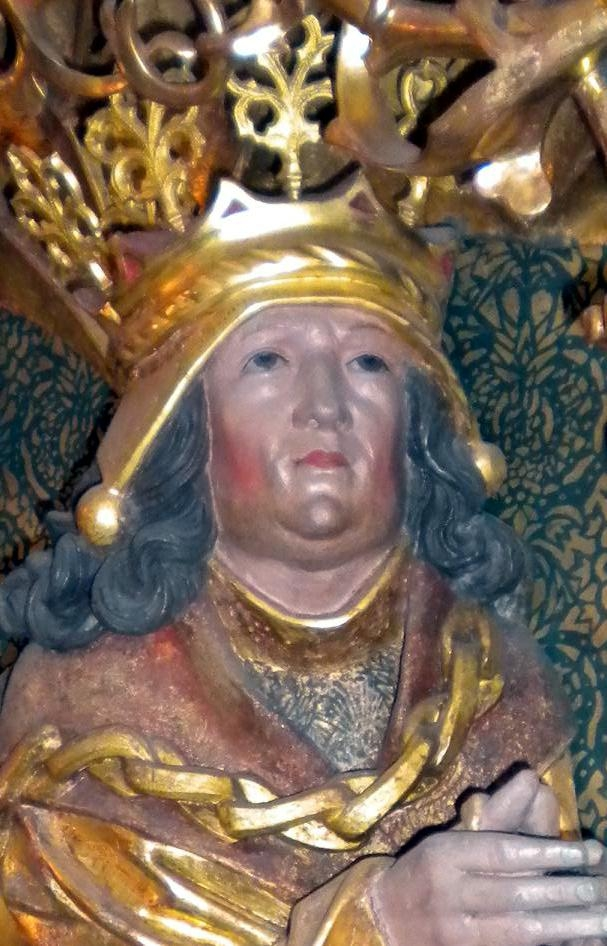
Hans, King of Denmark

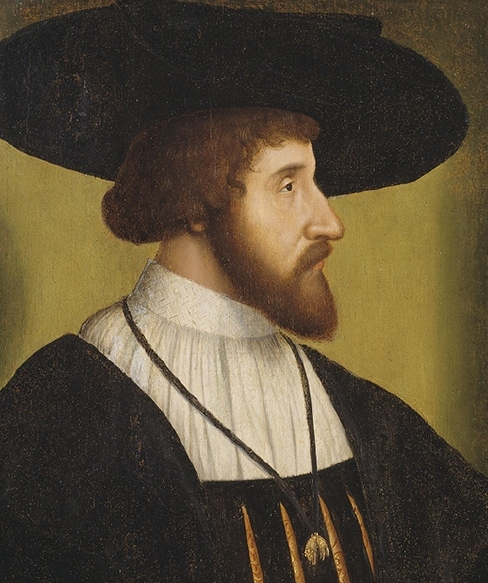
Christian II of Denmark

=== Emblems of the Kalmar Union ===
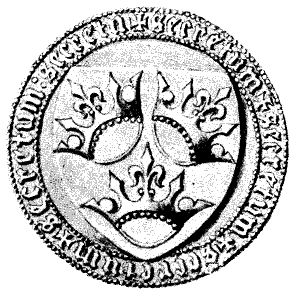
Seal of Margaret I of Denmark

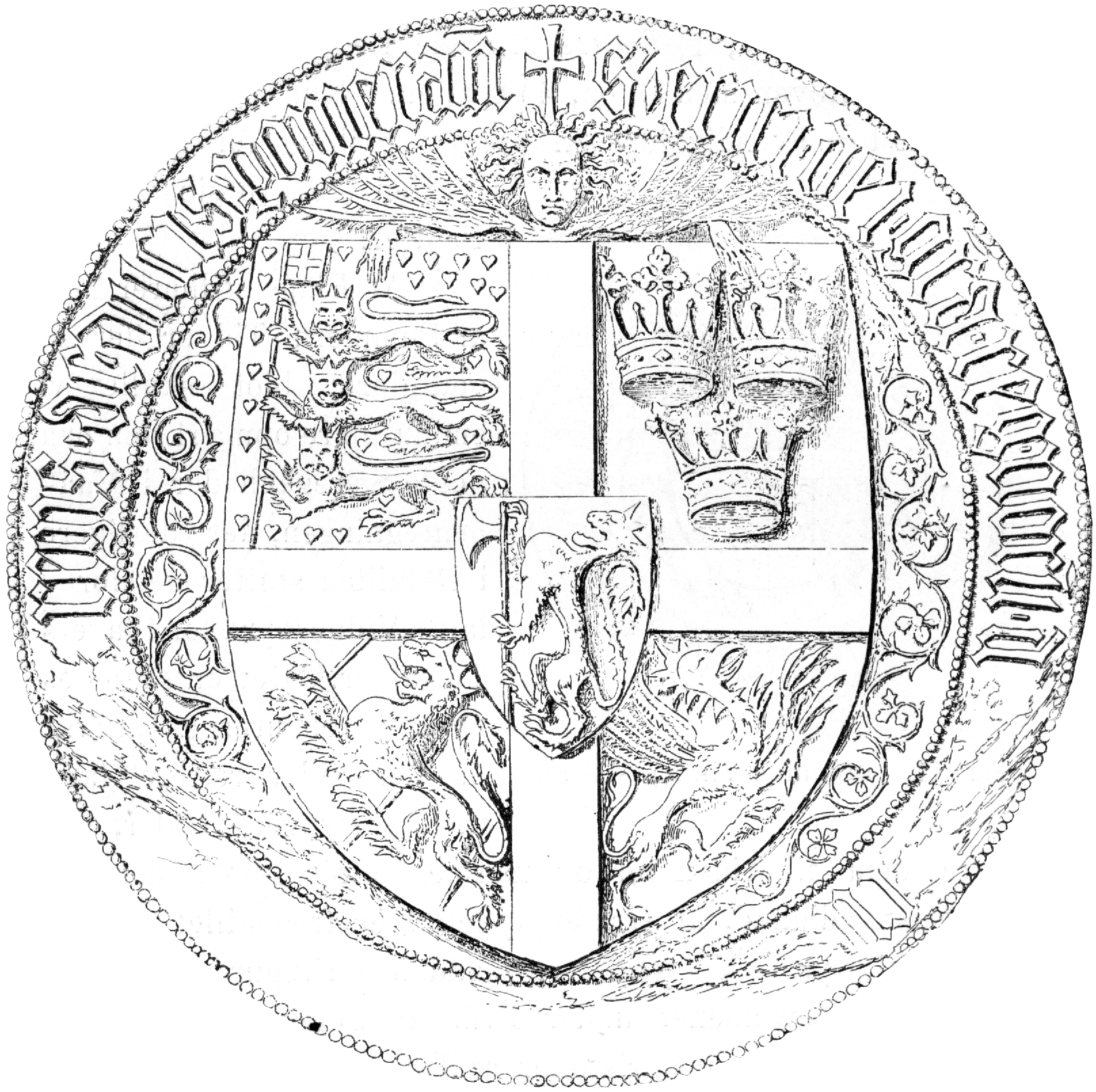
Seal of King Erik of Pomerania

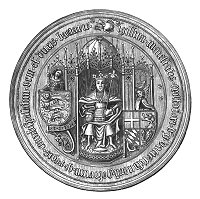
Seal of Christopher of Bavaria

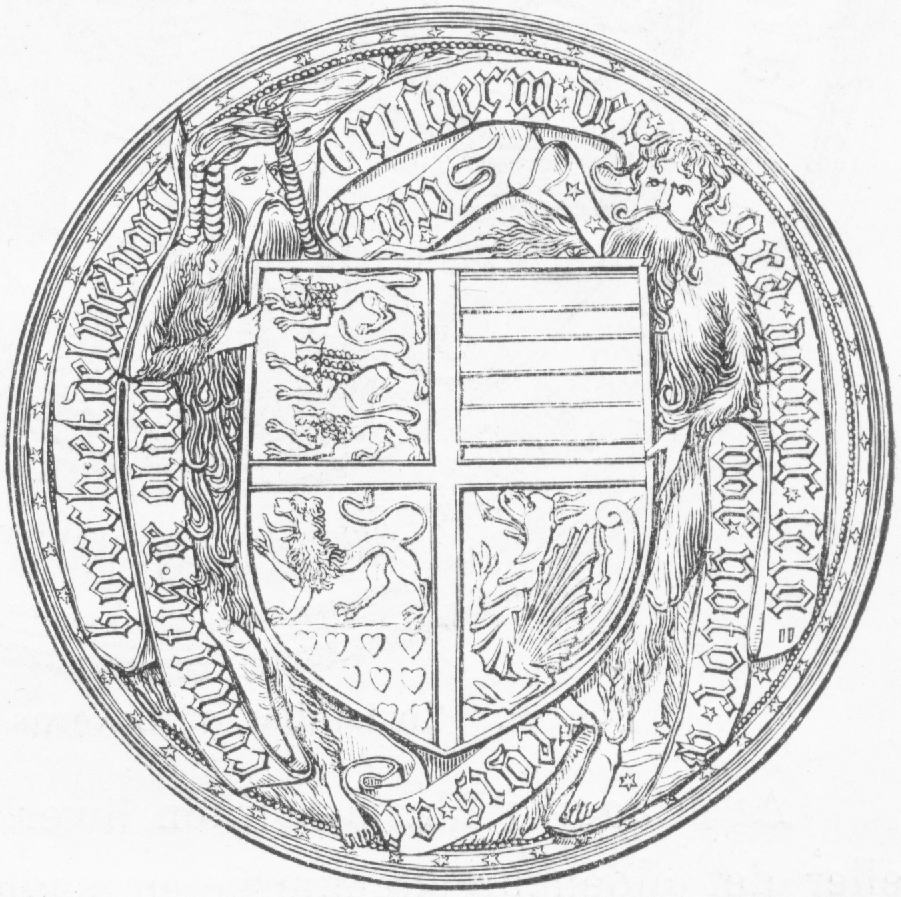
Seal of Christian I of Denmark (1449). Christian used a total of four seals during his reign, one replacing the other.

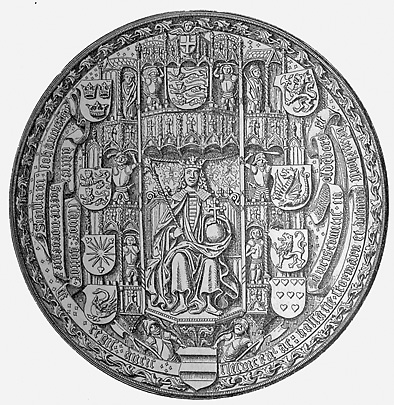
Seal of King Hans of Denmark, Norway and Sweden

The unofficial flag of the Kalmar Union as described by Erik of Pomerania

The coat of arms of Erik of Pomerania served as the official seal of the Kalmar Union during Erik's reign.

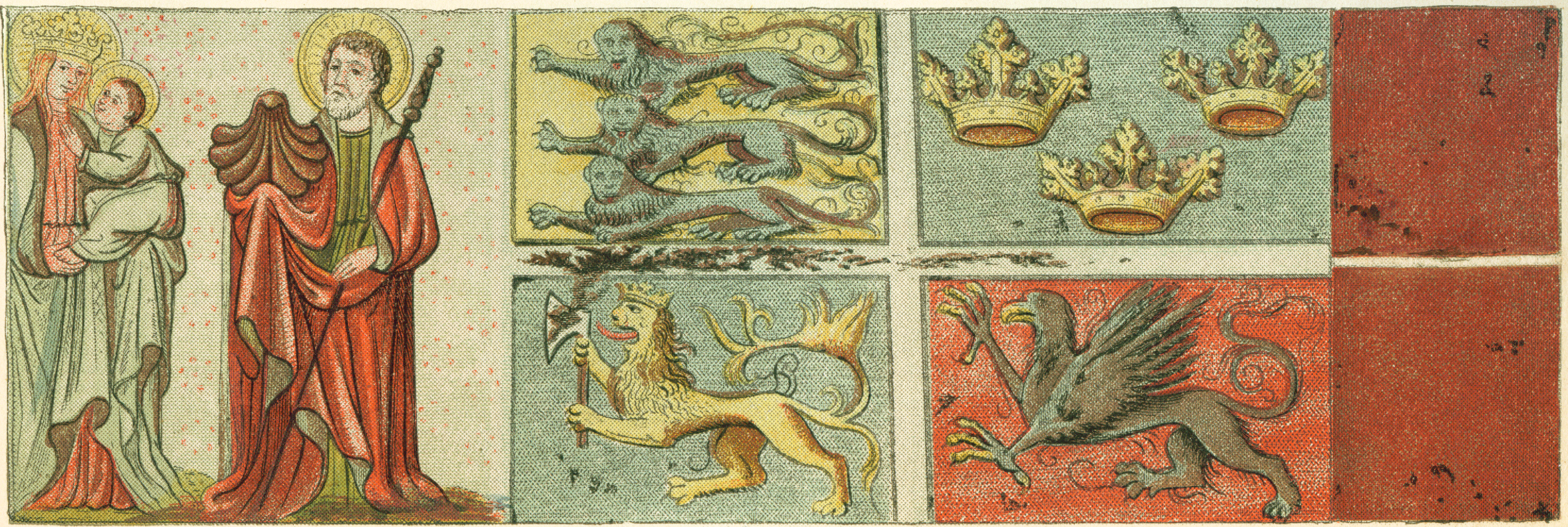
A medieval ship flag captured from a Danish ship by forces from Lübeck in 1427 displaying the arms of Denmark, Sweden, Norway and Pomerania

== See also ==
- List of Kalmar Union monarchs
- Scandinavian royal lineage chart for the time around the founding of the Kalmar Union
- Margrete: Queen of the North, a 2021 Danish film incorporating the Kalmar Union into the story
