= Siege of Copenhagen (1368) =

Siege and looting of Copenhagen by Hanseatic forces in 1368

- Part of the Danish-Hanseatic War (1361–1370)
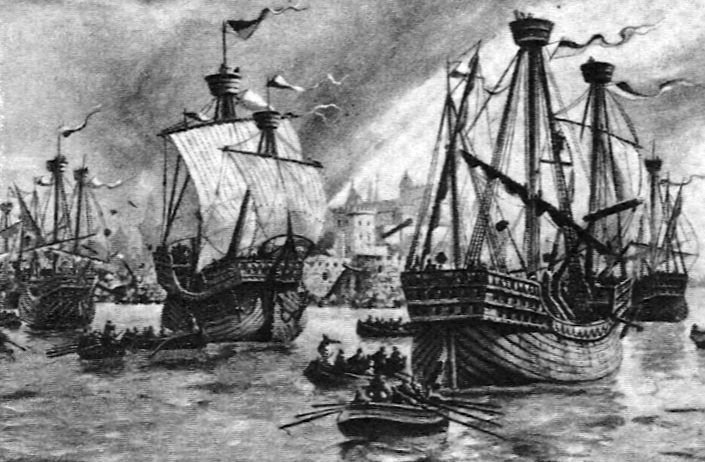
- Conquest of Copenhagen by German Hanse, 1368.
Date	4 April – 16 June 1368
Location	Copenhagen, Denmark 55°40′34″N 12°34′06″E
Result	Hanseatic Holsteinian victory
Territorial changes	Copenhagen occupied by the Hanseatic League and Holstein

Belligerents
Hanseatic League	Denmark

Commanders and leaders
Unknown County of Holstein	(Medieval Denmark) Unknown (surrendered)

Units involved
Unknown	(Medieval Denmark) Absalon's Castle garrison

Strength
37 ships 2,000 men	Unknown

Casualties and losses
Unknown	Unknown

The siege of Copenhagen (Danish: Belejringen af København) or the Capture of Copenhagen (Danish: Overtagelsen af København), was a looting and siege of Copenhagen and Absalon's Castle in 1368 between Denmark and the Hanseatic League, during the Danish-Hanseatic War (1361–1370). The city was looted and Absalon's castle was destroyed.

== Background ==
In November 1367, members of the Hanseatic diet held in Cologne formed a confederation to defeat Valdemar IV of Denmark. The confederation received support from Count Adolf of Holstein and Albert, King of Sweden. The war began when King Albert invaded Scania, quickly taking cities like Falsterbo, Ystad, and Simrishamn. Meanwhile, Nicholas, Count of Holstein-Rendsburg invaded Jutland taking Ribe and Viborg.

== Action ==
With 37 ships and 2,000 armed men, the main fleet weighted anchor from Lübeck on 4 April 1368, with Copenhagen as their target. Includingly, 400 horses, 8 trebuchets, 4 catapults, and several battering rams were also on board. When the fleet reached Copenhagen, the city quickly fell, however, Absalon's castle still held out. The castle would continue to do this for the next couple of weeks until the garrison surrendered with permission to move away freely.

== Aftermath ==
The Hanseatic leader describes the looting of the fort as follows:

[we] came up to the castle and found in a chest many beautiful things both of the king's silver tableware as well as jugs, trays, silver drinking vessels, bowls and dishes. In another chest we found exceedingly beautiful silk ornaments, as at festivals belong in the church. In a barrel we found his tournament gear, which belongs to him horses etc.

— Hanseatic leader

It seems that the king's property was not allowed to be taken away by the Danes. Now an important choice was to be made, and after much consideration, the Hanseatics agreed to destroy Absalon's Castle. As such they could hinder the Danes in retaking Copenhagen.

== See also ==
- Battle of Helsingborg (1362) – 1362 Danish victory
- History of Copenhagen – Chronologial history of the Danish capital city
- Siege of Vordingborg – Siege between the Hanseatic League and Denmark between 1368–1370
- Siege of Kolding (1368–1369) – Siege in Denmark, 1369

== Bibliography ==
- Reisnert, Anders (2015). The Siege and Storm of Lindholmen during the Second Hanseatic War (1368-1369) (PDF). Sweden: DR. RUDOLF HABELT GMBH • BONN.
- Steenstrup, Johannes (1907). Danmarks riges historie: 1241-1481 af Kr. Erslev [History of the Kingdom of Denmark: 1241–1481 by Kr. Erslev] (in Danish). Gyldendalske boghandel.
- Reinhardt, Christian (1880). Valdemar Atterdag og hans Kongegjerning [Valdemar Atterdag and His Royal Achievements] (in Danish). Gad.
- Etting, Vivian (2021). Margrete 1 (in Danish). Gyldendal.
