= List of Kalmar Union monarchs =

This is a listing of monarchs in the countries of the Kalmar Union. The union monarchs who were Danish kings, met with opposition in Norway and Sweden, which opposed them by appointing their own opposing monarchs and regents.

== Denmark ==
- 1387–1412: Margaret I (Margrete I)
- 1412–1439: Eric of Pomerania (Erik VII af Pommern)
- 1440–1448: Christopher III (Christoffer III af Bayern)
- 1448–1481: Christian I (Christian I)
- 1481–1513: John (Hans)
- 1513–1523: Christian II (Christian II)

== Norway ==
- 1387–1389: Margaret (Margrete I)
- 1389–1442: Eric of Pomerania (Erik III av Pommern)
- 1442–1448: Christopher of Bavaria (Christoffer av Bayern)
  - 1448–1449: Regent Sigurd Jonsson
- 1449–1450: Karl I (Karl Knutsson Bonde)
- 1450–1481: Christian I (Christian I)
  - 1481–1483: Regent Jon Svaleson Smør
- 1483–1513: John (Hans)
- 1513–1523: Christian II (Christian II)

== Sweden ==
Main articles: List of Swedish monarchs, List of Finnish monarchs

- 1389–1412: Margaret I (Margareta)
- 1396–1439: Eric of Pomerania (Erik av Pommern)
  - 1438–1441: Regent Karl Knutsson Bonde
- 1441–1448: Christopher of Bavaria (Kristoffer av Bayern)
  - 1448: Regents Bengt and Nils Jönsson Oxenstierna
- 1448–1457: Charles VIII (Karl Knutsson Bonde)
  - 1457: Regents Jöns Bengtsson Oxenstierna and Erik Axelsson Tott
- 1457–1464: Christian I (Kristian I)
- 1464–1465: Charles VIII (Karl Knutsson Bonde)
  - 1464–1465: Regent Kettil Karlsson Vasa
  - 1465–1466: Regent Jöns Bengtsson Oxenstierna
  - 1466–1467: Regent Erik Axelsson Tott
- 1467–1470: Charles VIII (Karl Knutsson Bonde)
  - 1470–1497: Regent Sten Sture the Elder (Sten Sture den äldre)
- 1497–1501: John II (Hans)
  - 1501–1503: Regent Sten Sture the Elder
  - 1504–1511: Regent Svante Nilsson Sture
  - 1512: Regent Eric Trolle
  - 1512–1520: Regent Sten Sture the Younger (Sten Sture den yngre)
- 1520–1521: Christian II (Kristian II Tyrann)
  - 1521–1523: Regent Gustav Eriksson Vasa

== See also ==
- List of Finnish rulers
- List of rulers of Iceland
