= Danish–Hanseatic War (1361–1370) =

Military conflict between Denmark and the Hanseatic League

- Part of the Danish–Hanseatic rivalry
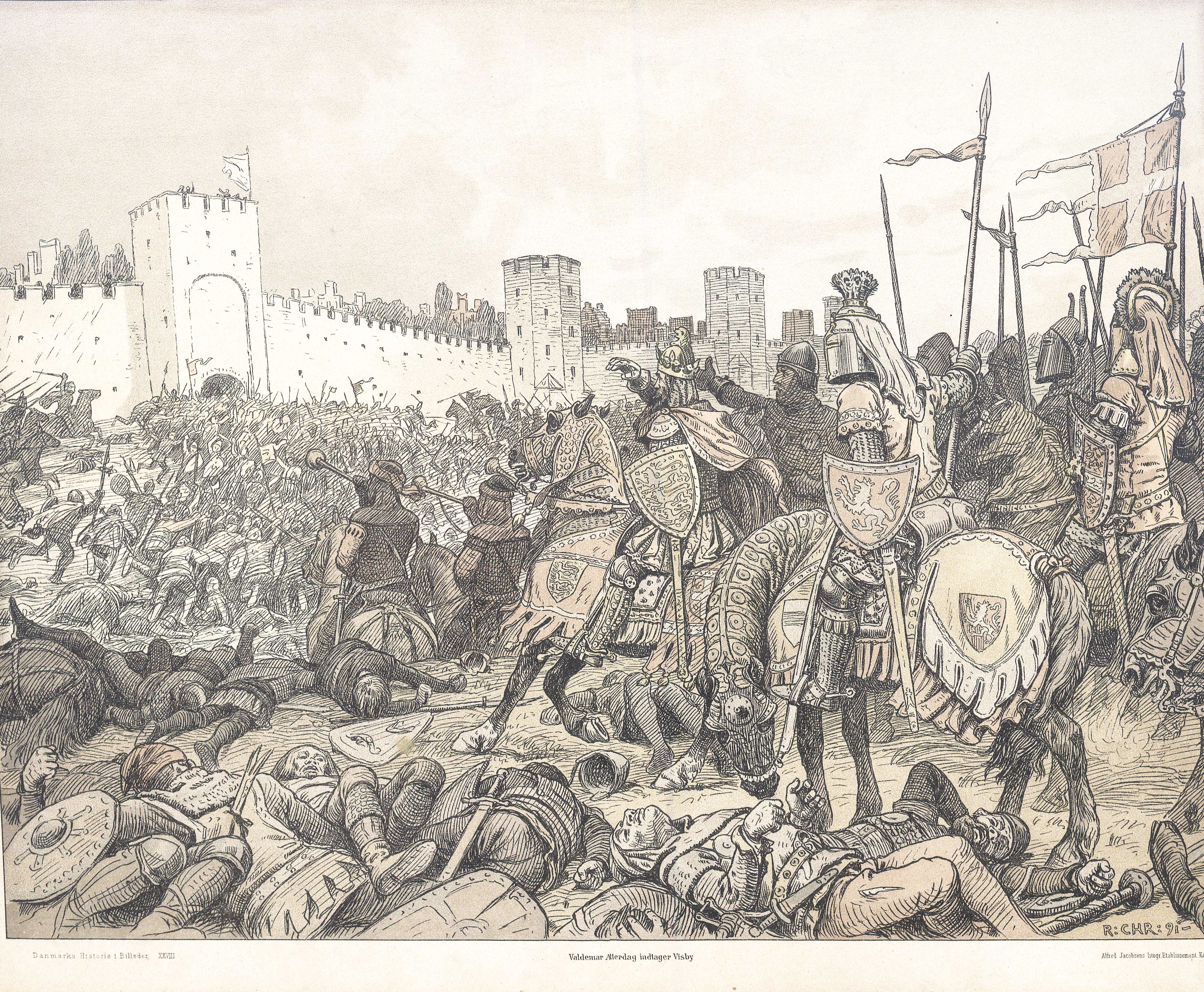
- Valdemar IV of Denmark enters Visby
Date	22 July 1361 – 24 May 1370
Location	Northern Germany, Scandinavia, and the Baltic Sea
Result	First Phase: Danish victory Second Phase: Allied victory
Territorial changes	first phase Denmark annexes Gotland; second phase Hanseatic League gains control over several forts in Scania

Belligerents
First Phase (1361–1365) Denmark	First Phase (1361–1365): Hanseatic League; Gotland; Lubeck; Stralsund; Norway; Sweden
Second Phase (1367–1370) Denmark Norway	Second Phase (1367–1370): Confederation of Cologne; Towns in Holland; Towns in Zeeland; Hanseatic League; Towns in Prussia; Towns in Livonia; Lubeck; Stralsund; Rostock; Teutonic Order; Sweden; County of Holstein; Duchy of Mecklenburg; Danish Noble Rebels

Commanders and leaders
(Medieval Denmark) Valdemar IV (Medieval Denmark) Christopher (WIA) (Medieval Denmark) Henning Podebusk (Kingdom of Norway (872–1397)) Haakon VI	Johann Wittenborg (executed) (History of Sweden (800–1521)) Magnus Eriksson (Mecklenburg) Albert The Hansetag

Units involved
Various German and Danish troops, compromising many German mercenaries; Danish fleet	Various armies from the Anti-Danish alliance; Hanseatic fleet; Combined fleet of the Confederation of Cologne; Gotland peasant militias

The Danish–Hanseatic War (1361–1370) was both a trade and territorial conflict mainly between the Kingdom of Denmark, led by King Valdemar IV, and the Hanseatic League, the latter of which was led by the rich and powerful merchant city of Lübeck. Though the first few years of the war resulted in several Danish victories, and even led to a beneficial truce for Denmark in 1365, the Hanseatic League, furious at the terms of the truce, resumed hostilities along with several allies and managed to defeat the Danes.

Though initiated by the Danish conquest of Gotland, the war quickly spread to encompass all territories where Denmark and the Hansa had conflicting claims. Scania and the Oresund, along with several coastal ports belonging to the Danish ally of Norway, were attacked and raided, and even the Danish capital of Copenhagen was ransacked. The resulting treaty, signed at Stralsund, secured the Hanseatic League's position as a great power in Northern Europe.

The Danish–Hanseatic War is split into two parts, one part starting with the Danish conquest of Gotland and ending with the Treaty of Vordingborg, which secured a tenuous truce between the combatants. The second part starts with the Hanseatic League's resumption of hostilities against Denmark and ending with the Treaty of Stralsund in 1370.

== Background ==
By 1361, the Hanseatic League had been the uncontested hegemon over the Baltic Sea for several years. German settlers colonized various parts of Prussia and Livonia, establishing settlements such as Riga. These towns and cities controlled trade through various means, and profited off of the lucrative Baltic trade. They also collectively worked together to eliminate piracy throughout the Baltic as well, which previously made trade in the region difficult.

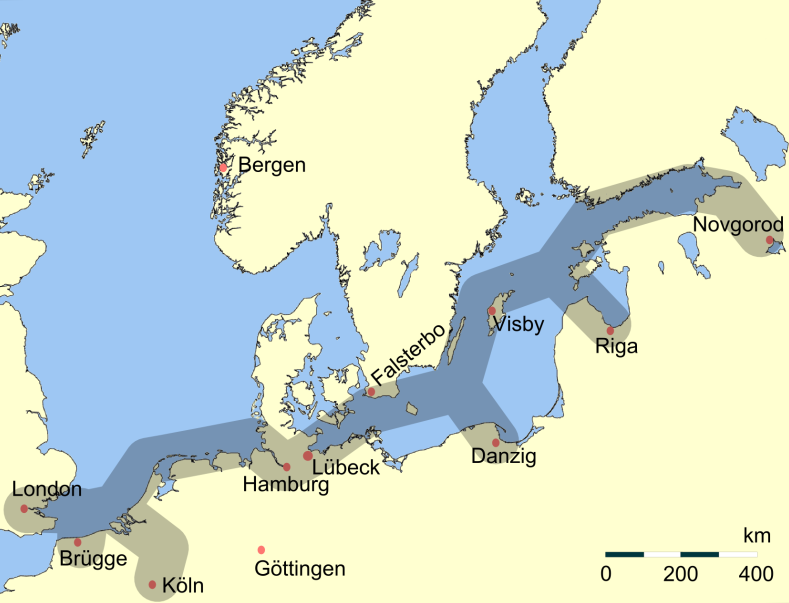
Key cities and trade routes of the Hanseatic League

Also important to the Hanseatic League were the fisheries of Scania. According to French Crusader Philippe de Mézières, there were around 300,000 people fishing throughout Scania. The region was also an important distribution center for goods transferring from the Baltic to the North Sea, for the Oresund passed between Scania and the Danish island of Sjælland.

The Hanseatic League had been granted several privileges in Scania by the Kingdom of Sweden, and as such the region was extremely profitable for the League. Lots of German merchants lived in Scania and multiple cities in the area were settled by those willing to fish. In 1360 however, Valdemar IV reconquered Scania, securing the region under Danish rule instead of Swedish rule. Though Valdemar IV allowed the Hanseatic League to keep their privileges in the region, it came at a high cost.

== First Phase (1361–1365) ==
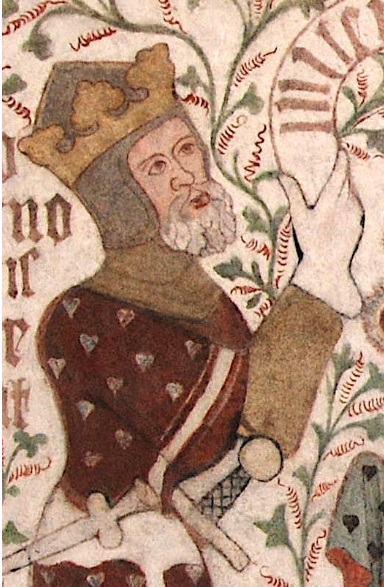
King Valdemar IV of Denmark

Valdemar, who had just managed to stabilize his kingdom after the catastrophic reign of Christopher II, had ambitions to further expand his Danish realm to become a new northern great power. In 1361, Valdemar launched an invasion on the island of Gotland.

Gutnish militia attempted to fend off the invasion, but they stood little chance against Valdemar's experienced army of mercenaries. On July 27, 1361, the Danish army crushed the Gutnish army in the Battle of Visby. Visby, the largest and most prominent city on the island, surrendered to Valdemar, paying a huge sum of tribute in order to prevent a sacking. With Visby under Danish control, the entire island was de facto under Danish rule.

The city of Visby, which had been for many years one of the most important trading posts in the Baltic Sea, was one of the most important Hanseatic ports there was at the time. Though Valdemar IV was willing to renew the cities Hanseatic charter, his expansion was still nonetheless viewed as aggressive by the Hanseatic League, and a diet of both Wendish and Pomeranian cities decided to suspend diplomatic and commercial relations with Denmark, and eventually declared war on the Danes, along with their allies of Sweden and Norway

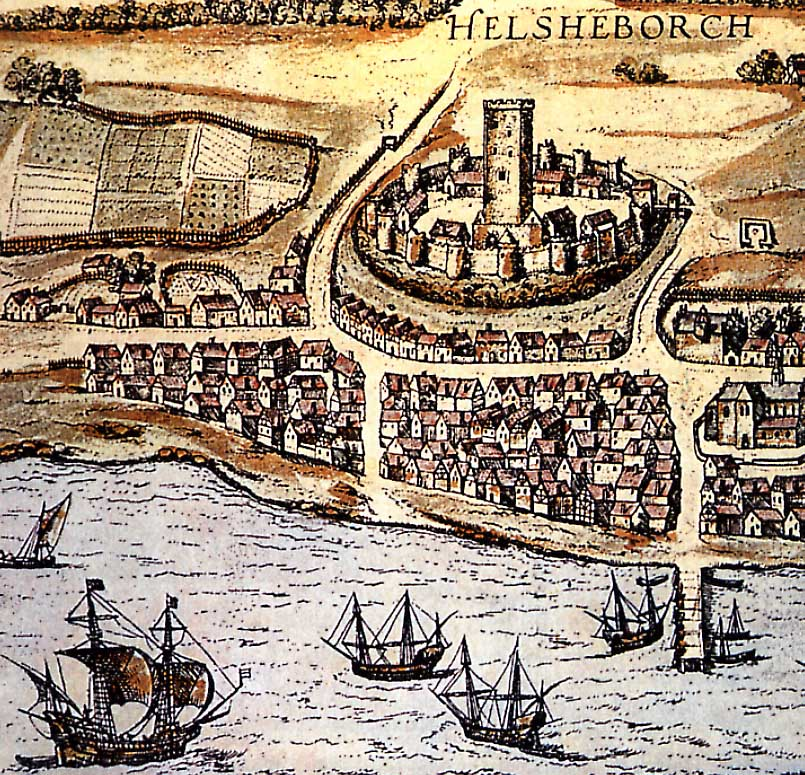
Artwork depicting the Scanian city of Helsingborg in 1588. Though anachronous, it shows the relevance of the city as a port

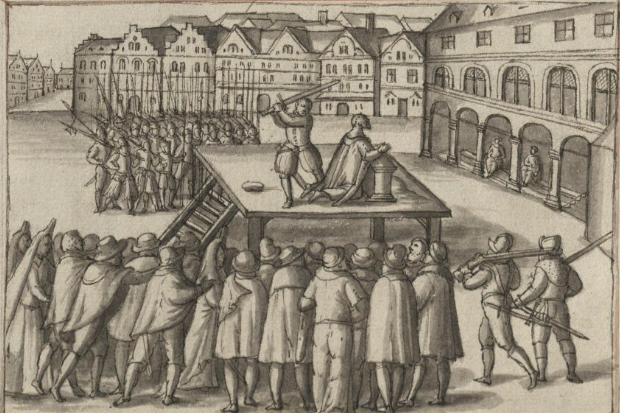
Execution of Johann Wittenborg

However, many members of the Hanseatic League did not fully participate in the war effort. Though the League was attempting a blockade on Denmark to stifle their economy, many members of league still traded with Denmark. The Dutch and Teutonic cities in particular were guilty of this, as despite providing financial subsidies to the Hansa, still continued trade with the Danish. As a result, the Hanseatic blockade proved ineffective, and the burden of the war fell upon the Wendish towns.

In April 1362, the commander of the Hanseatic fleet, Johann Wittenborg of Lubeck, landed his fleet of around 50 ships, 27 of which being cogs, in Helsingborg. His army went on foot to siege the city, but this proved to be a major mistake. Valdemar took the opportunity and attacked the Hanseatic navy, and succeeded in capturing 12 ships in the ensuing Battle of Helsingborg. Wittenborg successfully secured an armistice and fled, though he was eventually executed for his failures.

With this defeat, the Hanseatic League was seriously crippled. Though plans were made about a potential second expedition to attack Denmark, they resulted in nothing concrete. Three years of uneasy peace followed, and many of the Wendish towns who were still in the war bickered with one another over funding. It seemed like the Hanseatic League could potentially collapse at this very moment.

== Second Phase (1367–1370) ==
Despite multiple setbacks, the Hanseatic League managed to stay together. In 1366, a Hanseatic diet convened in Lubeck managed to keep the Kontores under control by granting the citizens full control over them. This kept most Hanseatic ports under control. More importantly, Valdemar IV, despite his successes in the beginning of the war, proved inept at ending the conflict. Instead of sowing discord between the Hanseatic states, Valdemar instead harassed Prussian vessels and merchants in the Oresund. Valdemar also adopted a hostile attitude towards the Dutch cities as well. These actions helped create an alliance between the Wendish cities, the Prussian cities, and the Dutch cities. Multiple other Hanseatic towns from various regions agreed to a formal military alliance, known as the Confederation of Cologne.

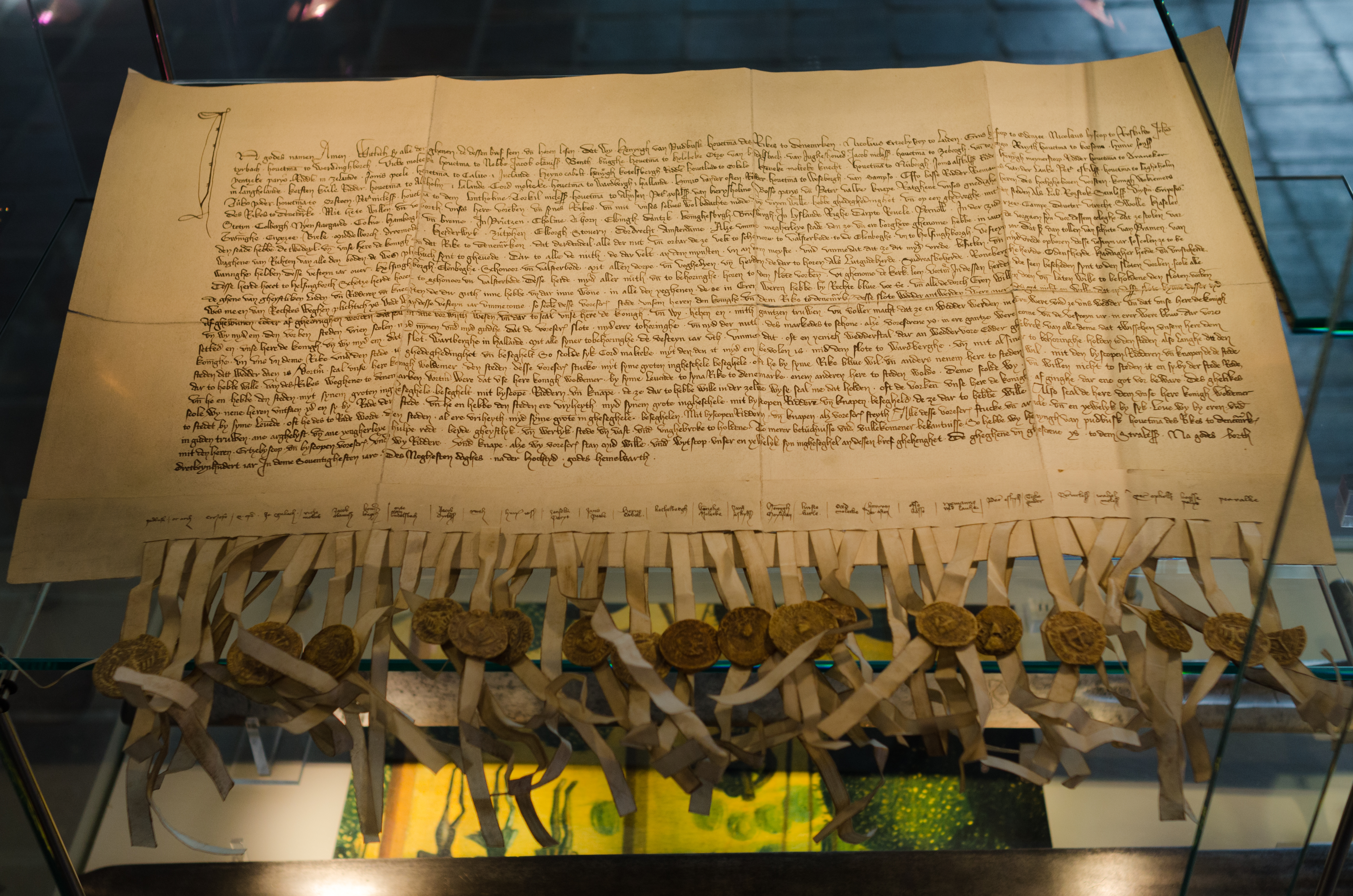
The Treaty of Stralsund

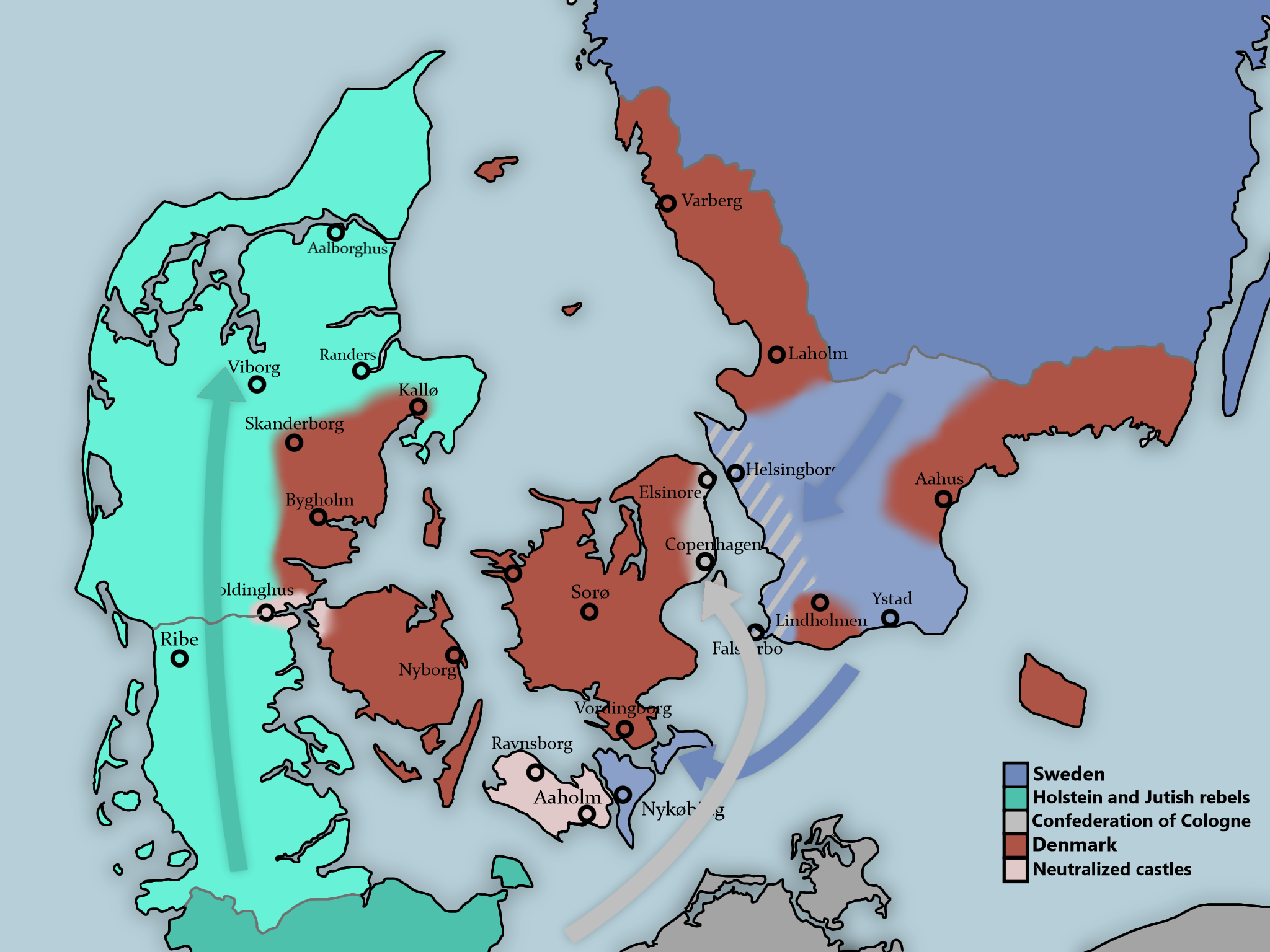
Military situation in Denmark (1370) after foreign invasions.

The Confederation, bolstered by alliances with Sweden, Mecklenburg, and Holstein, resumed hostilities against Valdemar, who now also had to deal with rebellious nobility. The Danish king fled Denmark in an attempt find potential allies, while Henning Podebusk was appointed drost of Denmark in the absence of Valdemar, yet Valdemar was unable to find any allies. Wendish ships raided the Danish and Norwegian coasts (Norway had joined the conflict on Denmark's side as King Haakon VI was the son-in-law of Valdemar), and the blockades on Norwegian ports in particular led to Norway's withdrawal from the war. Copenhagen was sacked by the Hanseatic fleet, with its port damaged beyond use for the remainder of the war. Swedish armies were sieging down Scania, being mostly successful except at Lindholmen. The Count of Holstein meanwhile marched his men throughout Jutland. When Helsingborg was captured in September, 1369, the Danish council sued for peace, and the Treaty of Stralsund was negotiated in the following year.

== Legacy ==
The treaty that concluded the war greatly benefited the Hanseatic League. Though the League had the chance to push for harsher terms, they instead were content with confirming charters that were already set. German merchants in Scania were no longer to be tolled, and free trade was to be enforced. More important was the acquisition of four key forts (Malmo, Helsingborg, Skanor and Falsterbo), which granted the Hanseatic League complete de facto control over the Oresund. The Hansa was also granted two-thirds of the revenue from the forts, and the Hanseatic League would also be granted the privilege of having a say in the Danish royal election.

The war proved that the Hanseatic League was capable of militarily challenging foes by raising its own armies and navies. It had directed much of the war's operations on their own and had shown that it was a force to be reckoned with. In the aftermath of the war, the Hanseatic League became one of the most powerful groups in Northern Europe, and despite not being a united entity in any way, it was united in their defence of trade and their mercantile hegemony.

The Cologne Confederation would last under 1385, and the Hanseatic League itself would continue to be a major player in Northern European affairs. However, Denmark would not forget its defeat in the war. Along with Sweden and Norway, both of which worried of the growing German influence pushing into Scandinavia, Denmark would go on to ratify the Kalmar Union, which itself would be a major competitor of the Hanseatic League and a major factor in its eventual decline by the 17th century.
