= Johann Wittenborg =

German admiral (1321–1363)

Johann Wittenborg (1321 – August/September 1363) was a merchant and mayor of the free port of Lübeck in what is now north Germany. He was admiral of the Hanseatic fleet at the Battle of Helsingborg and was tried and beheaded after losing this battle.

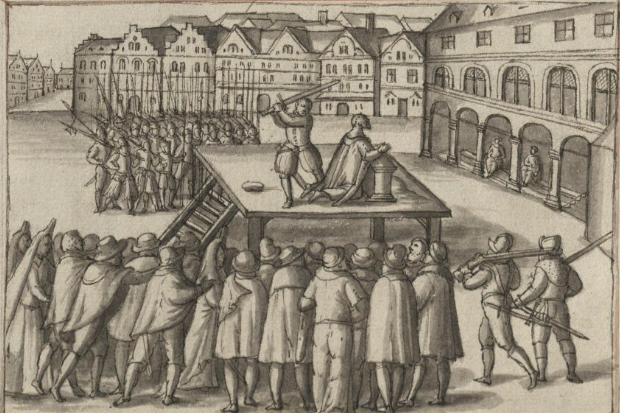
Execution of Johann Wittenborg (from the chronicle of Heinrich Rehbein, 1620)

Wittenborg was the son of the Lübeck citizen and merchant Hermann Wittenborg. From his early days, trips to Flanders (probably Bruges) and England are reported. As a merchant, he traded cloth, grain and fur from the Baltic area to London and Flanders. His business is documented in a traditional book of accounts from the years 1346-1359, which was already started by his father.

As Mayor of Lübeck and the free port's representative in the Hanseatic League, Wittenborg was made supreme commander over the Hanseatic fleet in the war with King Waldemar IV of Denmark in 1362. The fleet met the Danish fleet off Helsinborg in the Øresund strait and lost 12 ships in the ensuing action, at least partly because Wittenborg had put too many of his sailors ashore to fight the Danes on land. On his return to Lübeck Wittenborg was relieved of his duties and imprisoned.

Brought before the Hanseatic Council in January 1363, he was condemned to death for the Øresund defeat and "other reasons". He was beheaded in Lübeck market place in August or September 1363 and buried with the Dominicans of the Lübeck Castle Monastery.

He had married Elizabeth, daughter of the Lübeck councilor Arnold von Bardewik, and had six or seven children.
