= Danish–Hanseatic rivalry =

Medieval commercial and political rivalry between the Hanseatic League and Denmark

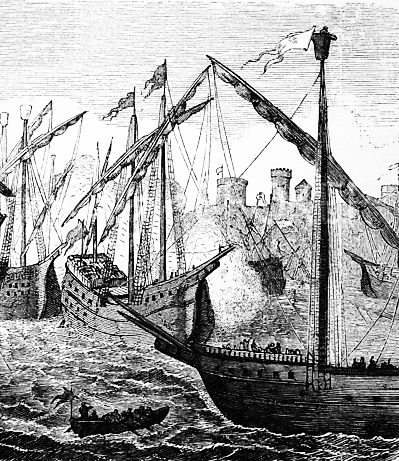
Hanseatic ships in front of Copenhagen in 1428

The Danish–Hanseatic rivalry was a rivalry between the German Hanseatic League and the Kingdom of Denmark, which lasted from the late 14th century up until the dissolution of the Hanseatic League in the 1660s. It consisted of many direct wars and proxy wars. Though both states were generally competitors across the 3 centuries in the Baltic Sea, there were periods of time where the two states coexisted peacefully, such as during the reign of Margaret I.

The Kalmar Union

== History ==
The rivalry began due to Denmark's attempt to become a major player in Baltic politics under Valdemar IV. Though he failed to seize Scania and Gotland in the Danish–Hanseatic War (1361–1370), his successors continued to put Denmark in a position to challenge the Hansa. During the age of the Kalmar Union, Danish kings successfully expanded their domain into Northern Germany, directly threatening Hanseatic cities like Lubeck.

The Hanseatic League was a major player in Danish politics in the 16th century as well. They supported Swedish independence from the Kalmar Union on numerous occasions, and funded rebels during the Count's Feud in an attempt to further weaken Denmark. By the 1600s however, Denmark had centralized and developed into a regional Dano-Norwegian power, and had surpassed the Hanseatic League in power. They monopolized the Baltic trade through the Øresund tolls, and Danish king Christian IV, was likely the richest man of his time.

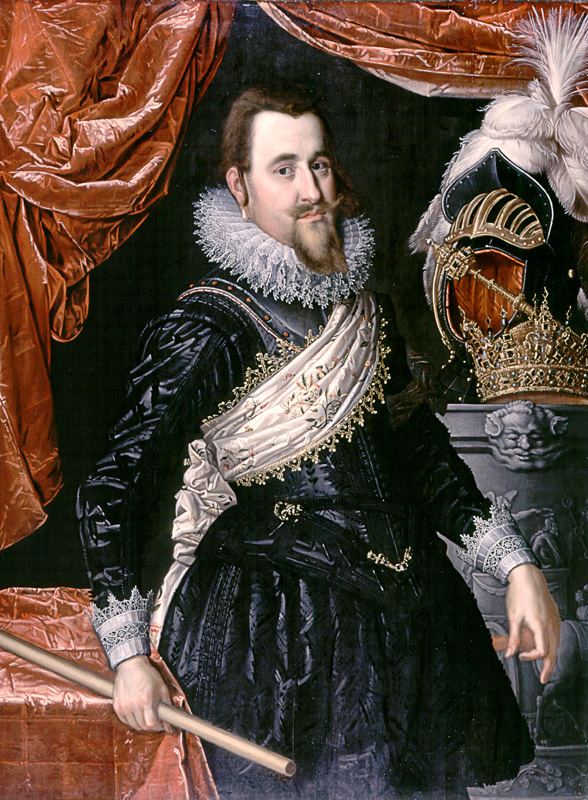
King Christian IV of Denmark

The Hanseatic League on the other hand had been in decline throughout the 16th century. During the 30 Years War, the Hanseatic League was commonly found torn between a power struggle between the Holy Roman Emperor and the Northern Protestants. Stralsund in particular suffered from this fate, as they were occupied by Sweden during the war. Much of the population of these Hanseatic cities were also ravaged by the war. Magdeburg for example was infamously sacked in 1631, and lost 80% of its population. Though the Hanseatic League was never formally disbanded, it faded out of relevance following a failed attempt at rekindling the League in 1669.

== List of Conflicts ==
- Danish-Hanseatic War (1361-1370)
- Danish-Hanseatic War (1426-1435)
- Dano-Swedish War (1501–1512)
- Engelbrekt rebellion
- Swedish War of Liberation
- Count's Feud
- Northern Seven Years' War
