= Treaty of Stralsund (1370) =

1370 peace treaty between Denmark and the Hanseatic League

Treaty between the Kingdom of Denmark and the Hanseatic League
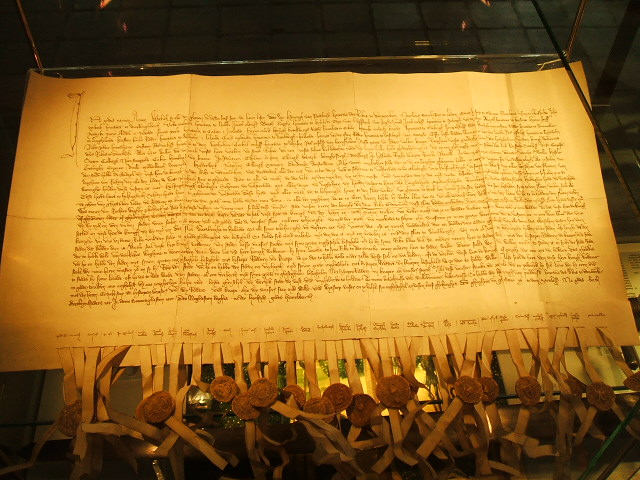
- The official treaty in the Stralsund Museum of Cultural History
- Type: Peace treaty
- Signed: 24 May 1370
- Location: Stralsund, Duchy of Pomerania (present-day Germany)
- Parties: Denmark Hanseatic League
- Ratifiers: Henning Podebusk; Niels Jensen; Jakob Pleskow; Bertram Wulflam

The Treaty of Stralsund (Danish: Stralsundfreden 1370, sgd 24 May 1370) ended the Second Danish-Hanseatic War between the Hanseatic League and the Kingdom of Denmark. The Hanseatic League reached the peak of its power by the conditions of this treaty.

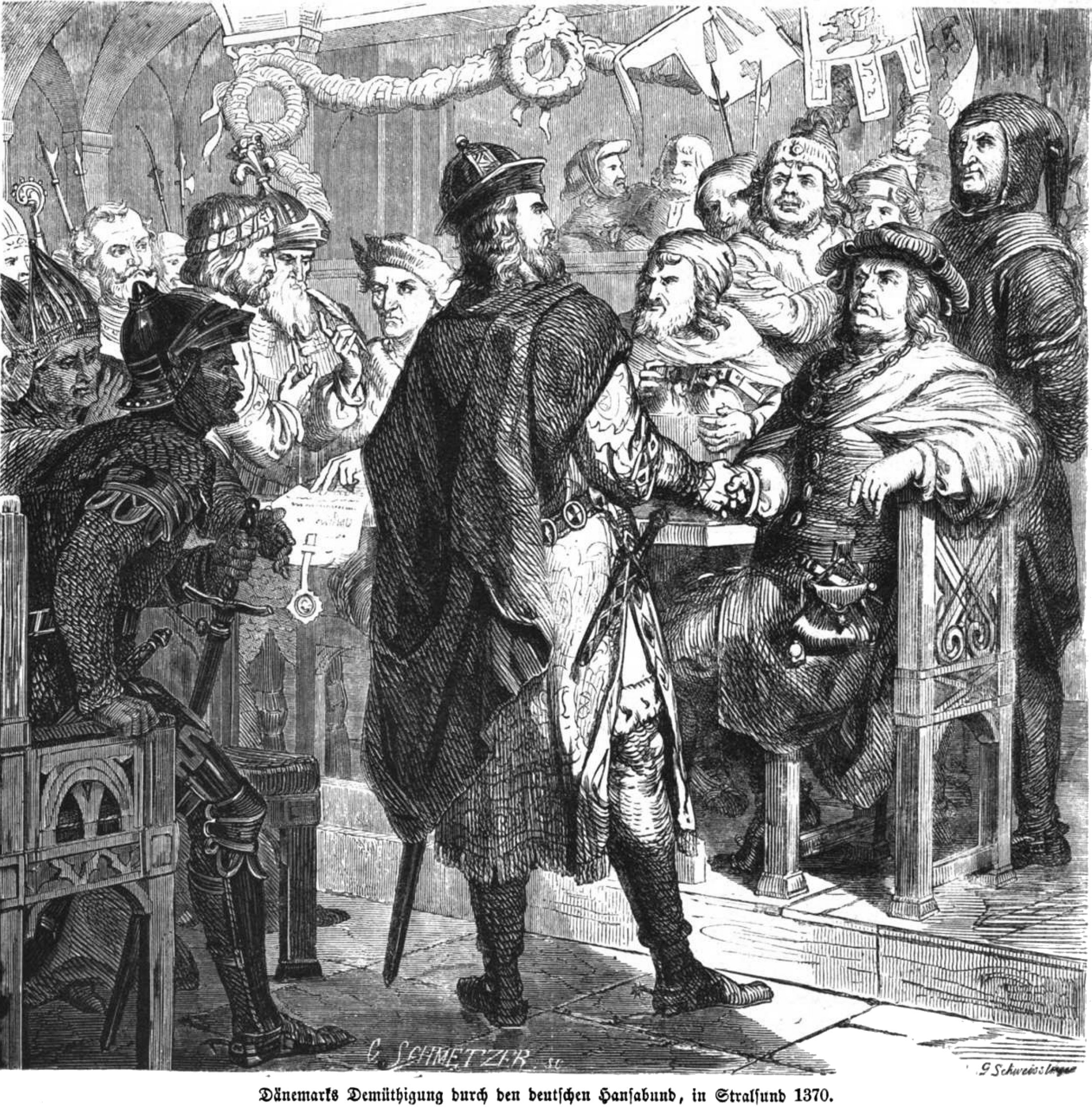
Denmark's humiliation by the German Hansa League, i Stralsund 1370. By Ernst Keil in 1864.

The war began in 1361 when Danish king Valdemar Atterdag conquered Scania, Öland, and Gotland with the major Hanseatic town Visby. In 1362, a Hanseatic counterstrike was repelled by the Danish fleet at Helsingborg. This led Hansa to accept a truce culminating in the unfavourable Treaty of Vordingborg, depriving the league of many of its privileges. Unwilling to accept the treaty, the Hanseatic League, which used to be a trade league rather than a political union, raised a fleet through the Confederation of Cologne in 1367 and renewed their Swedish alliances. Valdemar and his Norwegian son-in-law Haakon VI were utterly defeated in the following battles

The treaty was negotiated for Denmark by Drost Henning Podebusk and for the Hanseatic League by the burgomasters Jakob Pleskow of Lübeck and Bertram Wulflam of Stralsund. In the treaty, Visby's freedom was reestablished. Furthermore, Denmark had to assure the Hanseatic League of free trade in the entire Baltic Sea. The Danes had to waive taxes on German merchants in Scania as well. This gave the Hanseatic League a monopoly on the Baltic fish trade. The league also gained the right to veto against Danish throne candidates.

== See also ==
- List of treaties
- Treaty of Copenhagen (1441) – 1441 treaty between Hanseatic League and Burgundian Netherlands
- Battle of Helsingborg (1362) – 1362 Danish victory
- Dano-Hanseatic War (1426–1435) – 15th-century northern European conflict

== Bibliography ==
- Dollinger, Philippe (1999). The German Hansa. Routledge. ISBN 0-415-19072-X.
