= Confederation of Cologne =

14th Century military alliance to combat the Kingdom of Denmark

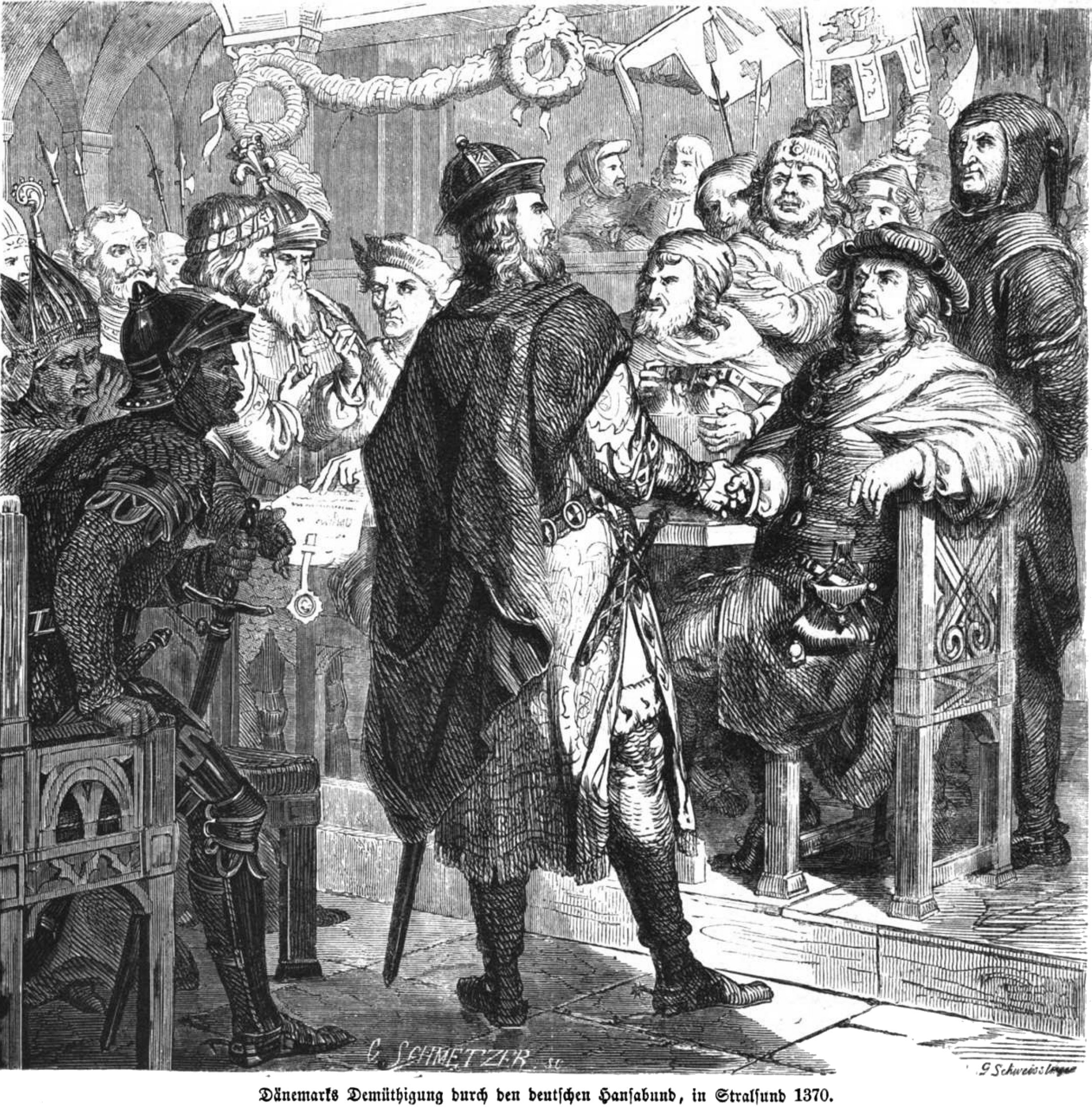
- Delegates from the Confederation discussing peace terms with the Danes in Stralsund, 1370
- Type: Military alliance between various cities and towns
- Location: Cologne
- Effective: 19 November 1367
- Expiry: 1385
- Parties: Hanseatic League; Towns in the County of Holland; Towns in the County of Zeeland; Zuiderzee towns
- Language: Middle Low German

The Confederation of Cologne (Danish: Kølner-konføderationen) was a medieval military alliance formed to combat the Kingdom of Denmark. It was established on 19 November, 1367 by several Hanseatic cities and other towns from Holland, Zeeland and Zuiderzee.

Though originally only meant as a method of containing the growing Danish threat, the Confederation would remain intact for another 15 years after the signing of the Treaty of Stralsund, which concluded the Danish-Hanseatic War of 1361-1370. The alliance would set financial and military measures, along with establishing certain mercantile traditions that would be standardized across the Hanseatic sphere of influence.

== Background ==
Denmark, under the reign of King Valdemar IV, had spent much of his reign reducing the autonomy of his nobility, seizing land to expand the crown lands, and creating a stable financial situation. With his kingdom secured, Valdemar sought to expand his influence. He reconquered Scania from Sweden in 1360, and conquered Gotland as well in 1361, after a decisive victory at the Battle of Visby.

Because Visby and Gotland were under the Hanseatic sphere of influence, the Hanseatic league subsequently declared war following the Danish conquest. However, the League nearly lost the Danish-Hanseatic War at the Battle of Helsingborg and in response negotiated a truce with Denmark at Vordingborg in 1365.

In 1367, the Hansetag met in the Rhenish city of Cologne to formalize a military alliance, and the Hanseatic cities of Lübeck, Rostock, Stralsund, Wismar, Kulm and Thorn, along with the Dutch cities of Elbing, Kampen, Harderwyk, Elburg, Amsterdam and Briel were present. Cologne was chosen due to its proximity to the Dutch cities (the Dutch being vital to Hanseatic interests in the war.)

== Terms of the Confederation ==
Economically, the Confederation agreed upon certain measures to enforce. Taxes were to be levied on all goods in member ports, and to simplify collection, specific currencies were chosen for each major region of the Hanseatic League, specifically the currencies of Lubeck, Flanders, Pomerania, Prussia and Livonia.

Militarily, all members of the Confederation had a fixed amount of ships and men to provide. Departure dates for cities throughout the Baltic and North Sea were also decided upon, to ensure the combined Confederate navy could assemble in the Oresund for a final assault on Denmark.

Notably the original language of the treaty is not Latin like most Medieval texts, but in Middle Low German, the language used by the Hanseatic cities.

== History ==
At first, the Confederation did not receive much support from some Hanseatic cities. Bremen and Hamburg, for example, were exhausted due to previous wars, and refused to provide any military support, though financial aid was granted. Inland Hanseatic towns, which were not affected by the maritime war against Denmark, refused to aid at all. The Westphalian towns in particular failed to even subsidize the Confederation at all.

Despite these setbacks, the Confederation managed to secure alliances with Sweden, Mecklenburg and Holstein. They also acquired alliances with Danish nobles that were displeased with Valdemar IV. Together, the Confederation broke the Truce of Vordingborg and resumed war with Denmark. In the following years, the Confederation invaded Denmark, sacked Copenhagen, and enforced a peace at Stralsund in 1370. The years following the aftermath of the war marked the Golden Age of the Hanseatic League.

In 1385, when the Hanseatic League finally relinquished control of Danish forts in Scania, multiple cities in the Confederation debated whether or not keeping the Confederation together was worthwhile. There was no reason to keep a military alliance together anymore, because the Danish king at the time was loyal to the Hanseatic League (due to the terms of the Treaty of Stralsund). Though the Teutonic Order, which represented the interests of Prussian towns, wished to continue the Confederation, other towns decided to disband the alliance, as they wished to be more free to pursue their own desires than have to continuously subsidize operations that did not benefit them.

Though the Confederation of Cologne ended in 1385, it provided the cohesion that the Hansa would need in future wars against Denmark. Despite it not being a permanent model for future Hanseatic agreements, it nonetheless was considered an impressive alliance, and multiple groups in the 15th century attempted to replicate it, with no success. These attempted confederations are known as Tohopesaten.
