= Battle of Helsingborg (1362) =

1362 Danish victory

Coordinates: 55°45′N 12°45′E

- Part of the Danish-Hanseatic War (1361–1370)
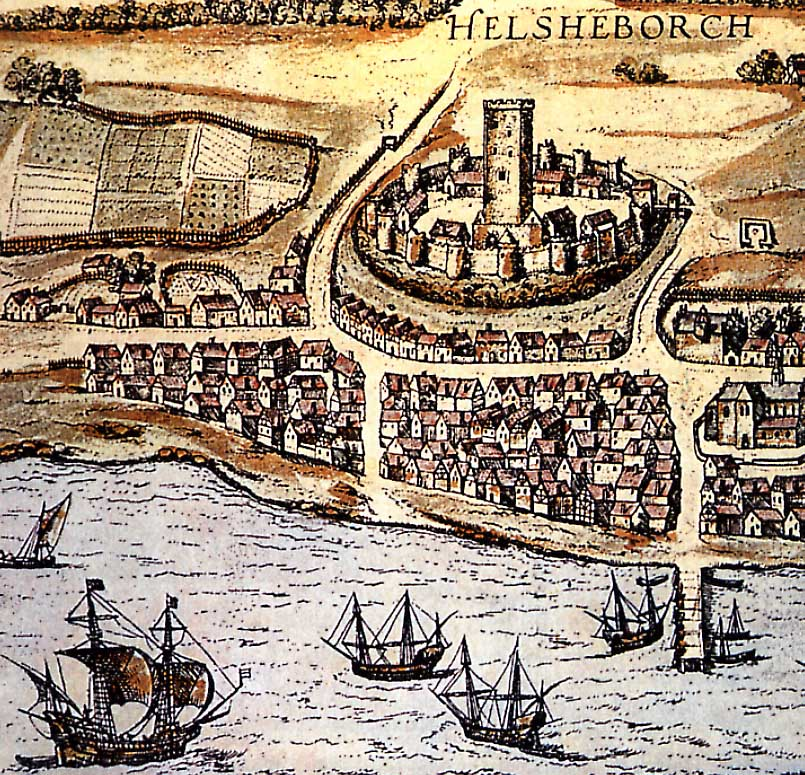
- Helsingborg in 1588, dominated by the citadel
Date	8 July 1362
Location	Øresund off Helsingborg
Result	Danish victory

Belligerents
Denmark	Hanseatic League

Commanders and leaders
(Medieval Denmark) Valdemar IV (Medieval Denmark) Christoffer (WIA) (Medieval Denmark) Peder Nielsen	Johann Wittenborg; Bruno Warendorp

Strength
Ships capable of carrying 2,500 men	50 ships, 5 paid for by Sweden; 3,000 men

Casualties and losses
Unknown	12 cogs

The Battle of Helsingborg was fought on 8 July 1362 between the Danish and Hanseatic fleets during the Danish-Hanseatic War (1361–1370).

== Background ==
As part of the ongoing trading and territorial disputes between the Hanseatic League, Sweden, and Denmark, the Hanseatic cities made an agreement with Sweden and Holstein to jointly attack Denmark, the agreed targets being Helsingborg and Copenhagen. The Mayor of Lübeck, Johann Wittenborg, was put in command of an attack force of some 3,000 men, and 50 small seagoing ships, 5 of which had been paid for by Magnus Eriksson, King of Sweden.

As Wittenborg's fleet sailed through the narrow Øresund en route to Copenhagen, he was persuaded to attack the town of Helsingborg and its fortified citadel. He disembarked his fighting men and besieged the stronghold for several weeks. Meanwhile, Valdemar Atterdag, King of Denmark, assembled his fleet capable of carrying an army of 2,500 men and made a surprise attack on the Hanseatic Fleet.

The Danish were victorious, as most of Wittenborg's soldiers were in the town. The Hanseatic cities lost twelve of their ships and several of their nobles were captured.

== Aftermath ==
The son of Valdemar IV, Christopher, Duke of Lolland was injured during the battle. German chronicles are not clear about what weapon inflicted the prince's mortal wound, but according to Swedish Henrik Smith's chronicle from the early 16th century, Christopher was hit by a rock while fighting at sea. According to Nordisk familjebok, Christopher was shot in the head with a rock and subsequently suffered from a mental disorder.

On his return to Lübeck, Wittenborg was tried and executed because of his poor performance in the war. The captured nobles were later ransomed. The war was brought to an end on 22 November 1365 by the peace treaty of Vordingborg.
