= Alken, Denmark =

Alken
- Village
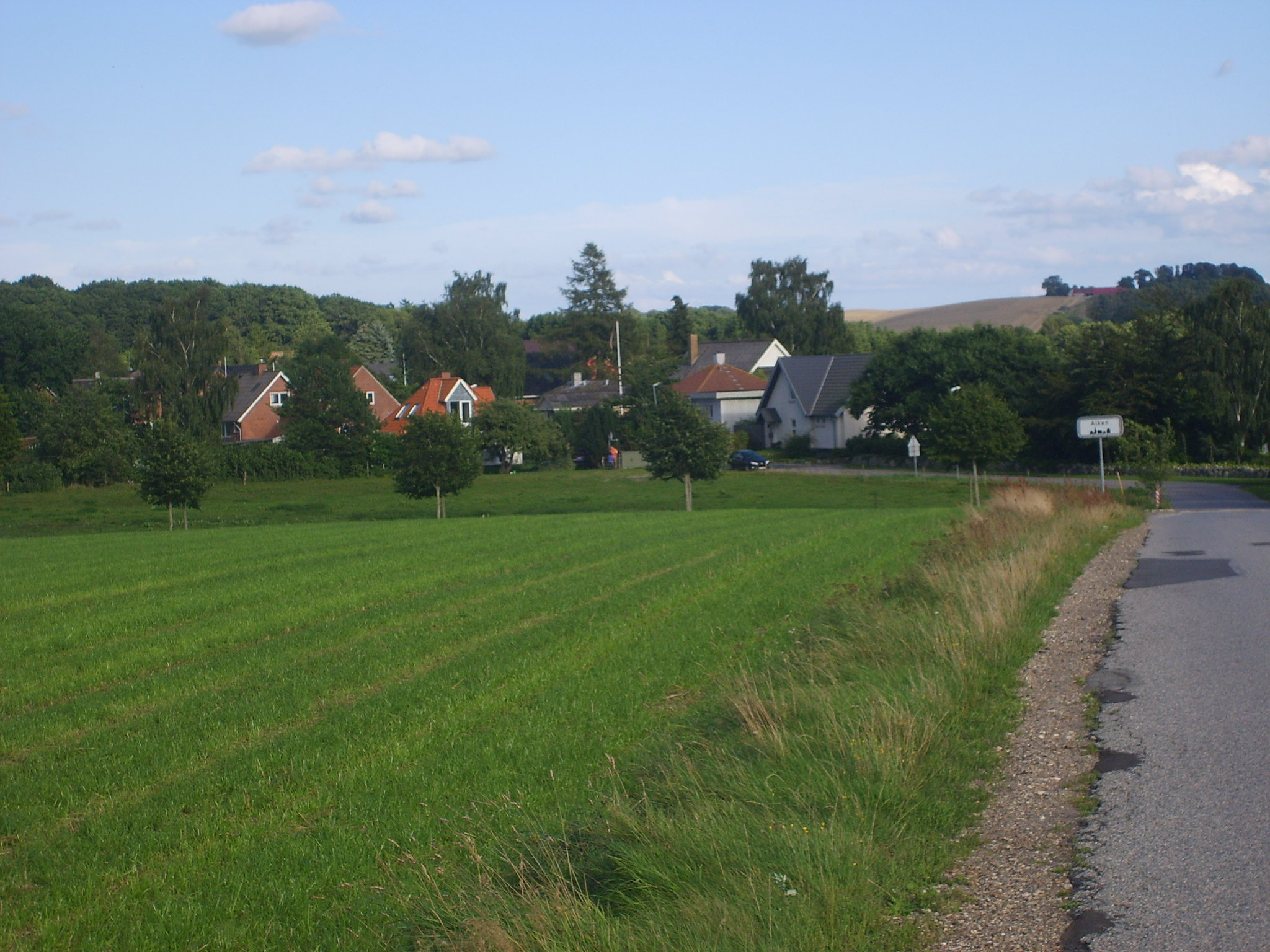

- Location in Central Denmark Region Alken (Denmark)
- Coordinates: 56°3′7″N 9°50′49″E
- Country: Denmark
- Region: Central Denmark (Midtjylland)
- Municipality: Skanderborg

Population (2026)
  - Total: 333
- Time zone: UTC+1 (Central European Time)
  - Summer (DST): UTC+2 (Central European Summer Time)

Alken is a village in Skanderborg Municipality, Denmark, with a population of 333 (1 January 2026).

Alken is located a short distance from the Mossø lake in the Søhøjlandet (English: the Lake-highland) area of Central Jutland.

Alken is served by Alken railway station, located on the Skanderborg–Skjern railway line.
