= Silkeborg railway station =

Railway station in Jutland, Denmark

Silkeborg
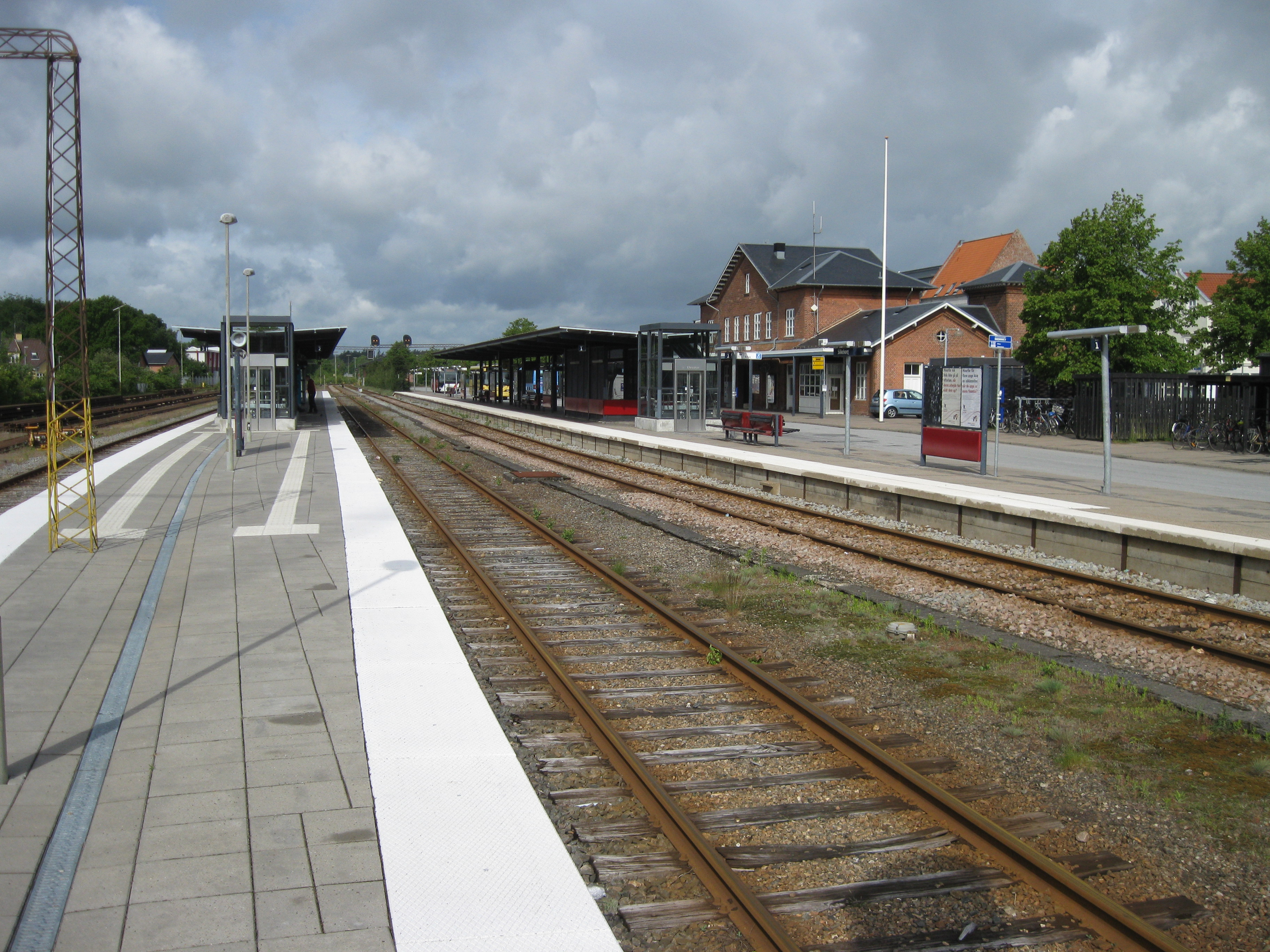
- Silkeborg station in 2011

General information
- Location: Drewsensvej 5; 8600 Silkeborg; Silkeborg Municipality; Denmark
- Coordinates: 56°9′51″N 9°32′39″E
- Elevation: 29.2 metres (96 ft)
- Owner: DSB (station infrastructure); Banedanmark (rail infrastructure)
- Line: Skanderborg–Skjern railway line
- Platforms: 2
- Tracks: 3
- Train operators: GoCollective

Construction
- Architect: Niels Peder Christian Holsøe

Other information
- Station code: Sl
- Website: Official website

History
- Opened: 2 May 1871

Services
Preceding station	GoCollective	Following station
Engesvang towards Skjern	Aarhus–Skjern Regional train	Svejbæk towards Aarhus Central
Location

Silkeborg station (Danish: Silkeborg Station or Danish: Silkeborg Banegård) is a railway station serving the town of Silkeborg in Central Jutland, Denmark. It is located in the centre of the town, on the southern edge of the historic town centre, and immediately adjacent to the Silkeborg bus station.

The station is located on the Skanderborg–Skjern railway line from Skanderborg to Skjern. The train services are currently operated by the private public transport company GoCollective which run frequent regional train services between Aarhus and Herning. The station opened in 1871 with the opening of the Skanderborg–Silkeborg railway line. The former railway connections to Horsens, Bramming, Rødkærsbro and Langå were closed in the 1960s, meaning the station is now an intermediate station on the Skanderborg–Skjern railway line.

The station building from 1871, built to designs by the Danish architect Niels Peder Christian Holsøe (1826–1895), was listed in the Danish registry of protected buildings and places in 1999.

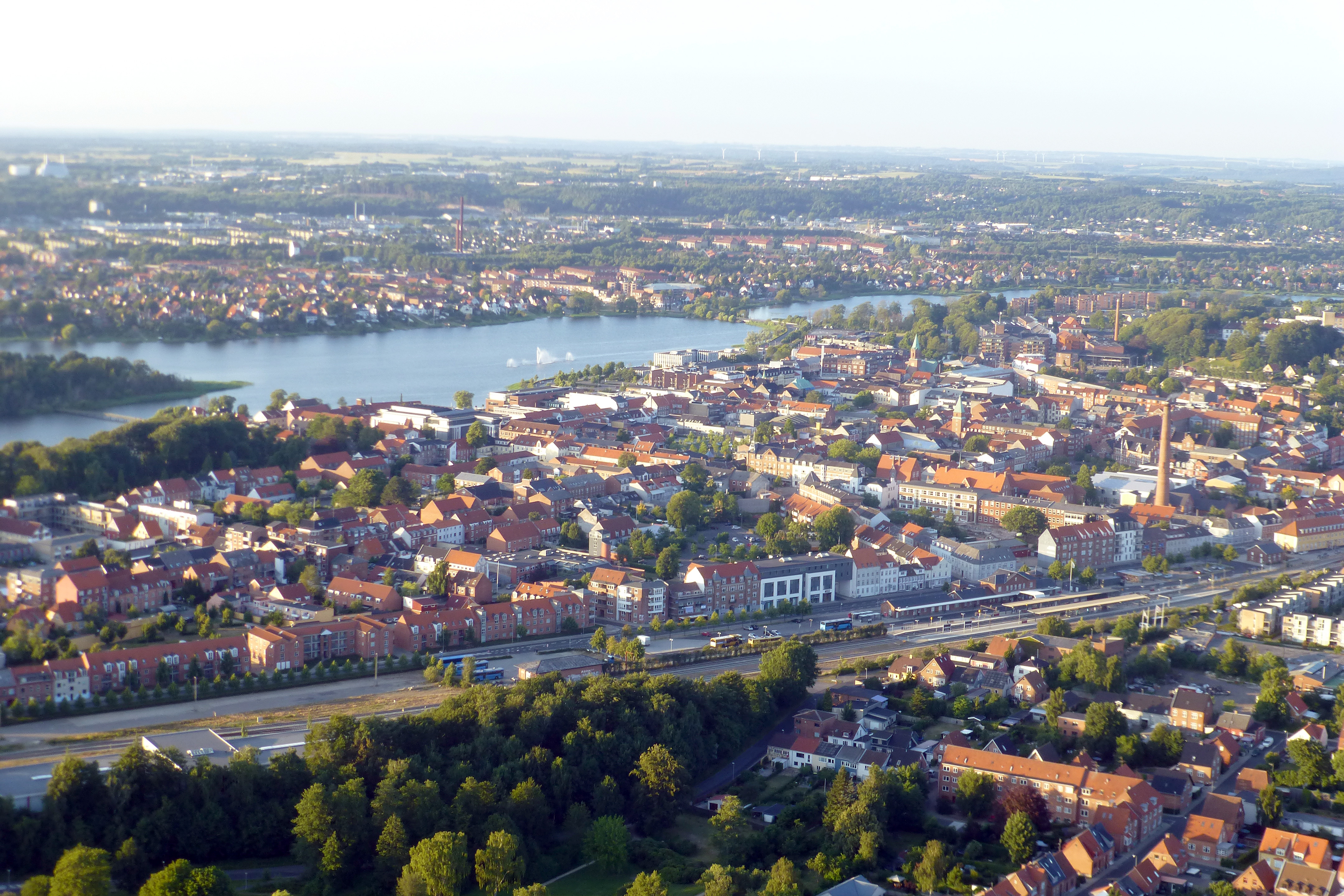
Aerial photograph of Silkeborg station in 2013.

== History ==
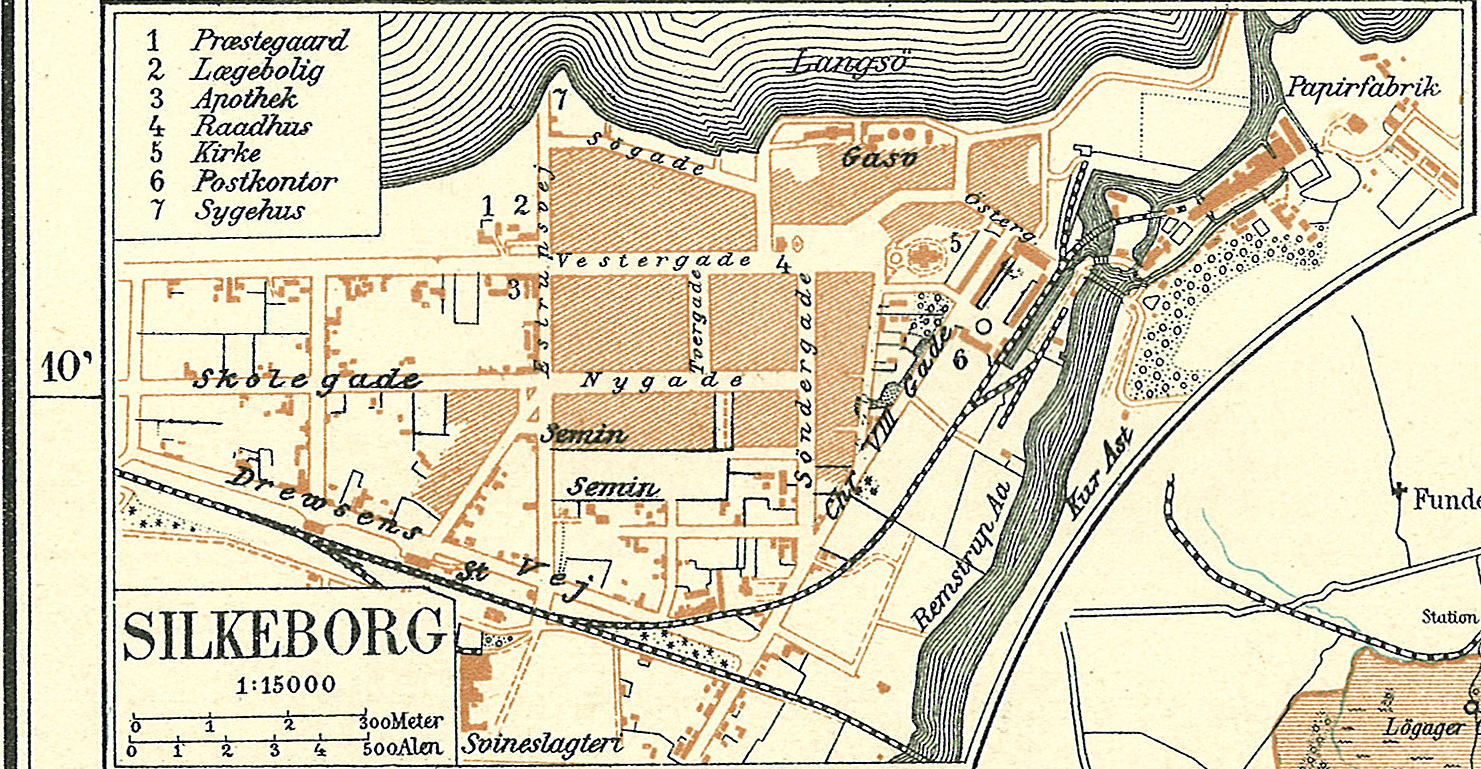
Map of Silkeborg with Silkeborg station, c. 1900.

The station opened on 2 May 1871 as the western terminus of the Skanderborg–Silkeborg railway line. A few years later, the railway line was prolonged to Herning in 1877, and since then Silkeborg station has been an intermediate station on the Skanderborg–Herning railway line.

The former railway lines to Horsens, Bramming, Rødkærsbro and Langå were closed in the 1960s, meaning the station has been left with eastward and westward connections only.

Until the 1990's an industrial track connected Silkeborg station with Silkeborg paper mill.

== Architecture ==
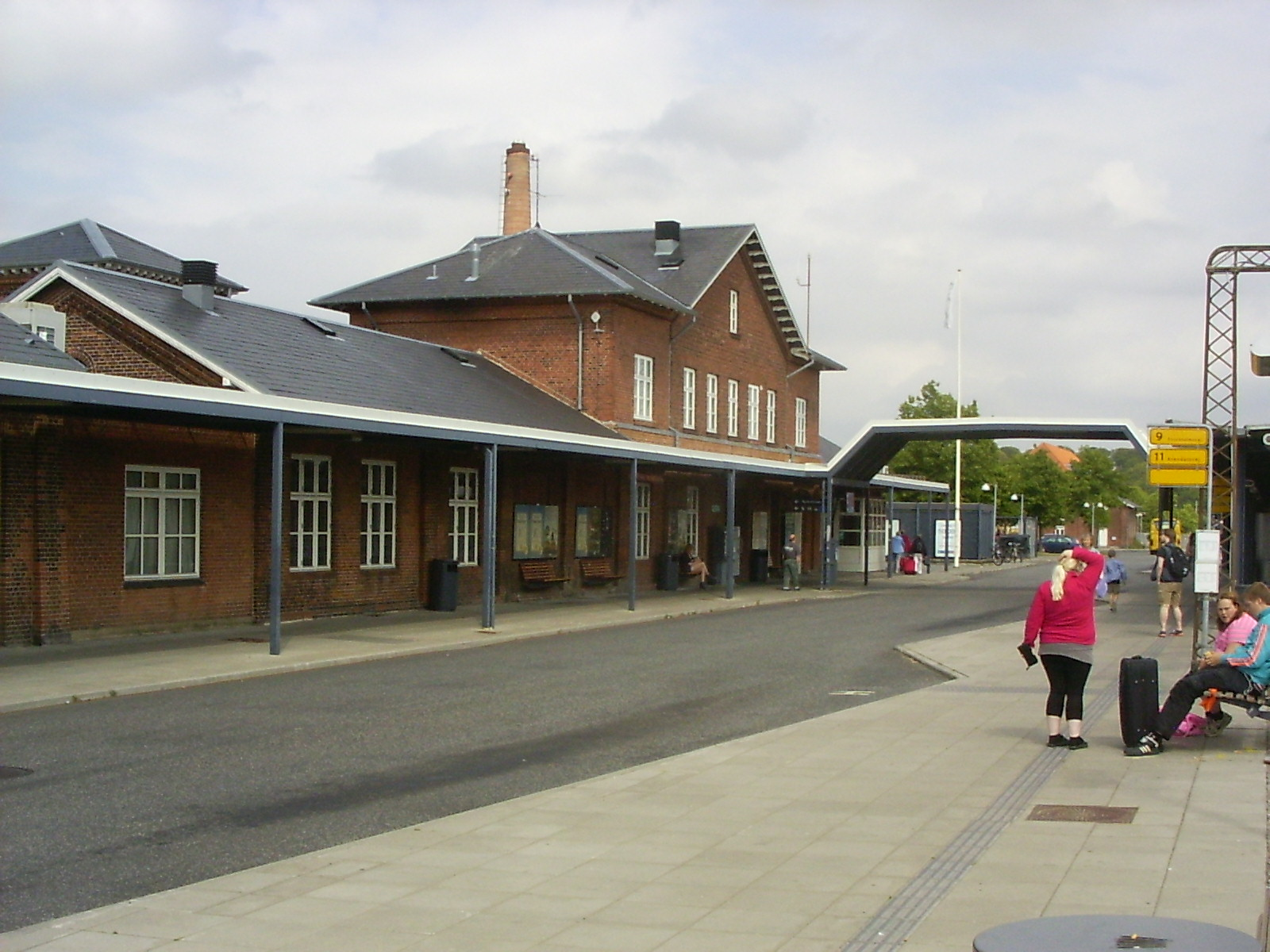
The station building in 2014.

The station building from 1871 was designed by the Danish architect Niels Peder Christian Holsøe (1826–1895), known for the numerous railway stations he designed across Denmark in his capacity of head architect of the Danish State Railways.

The station building was listed in the Danish registry of protected buildings and places in 1999.

== Facilities ==
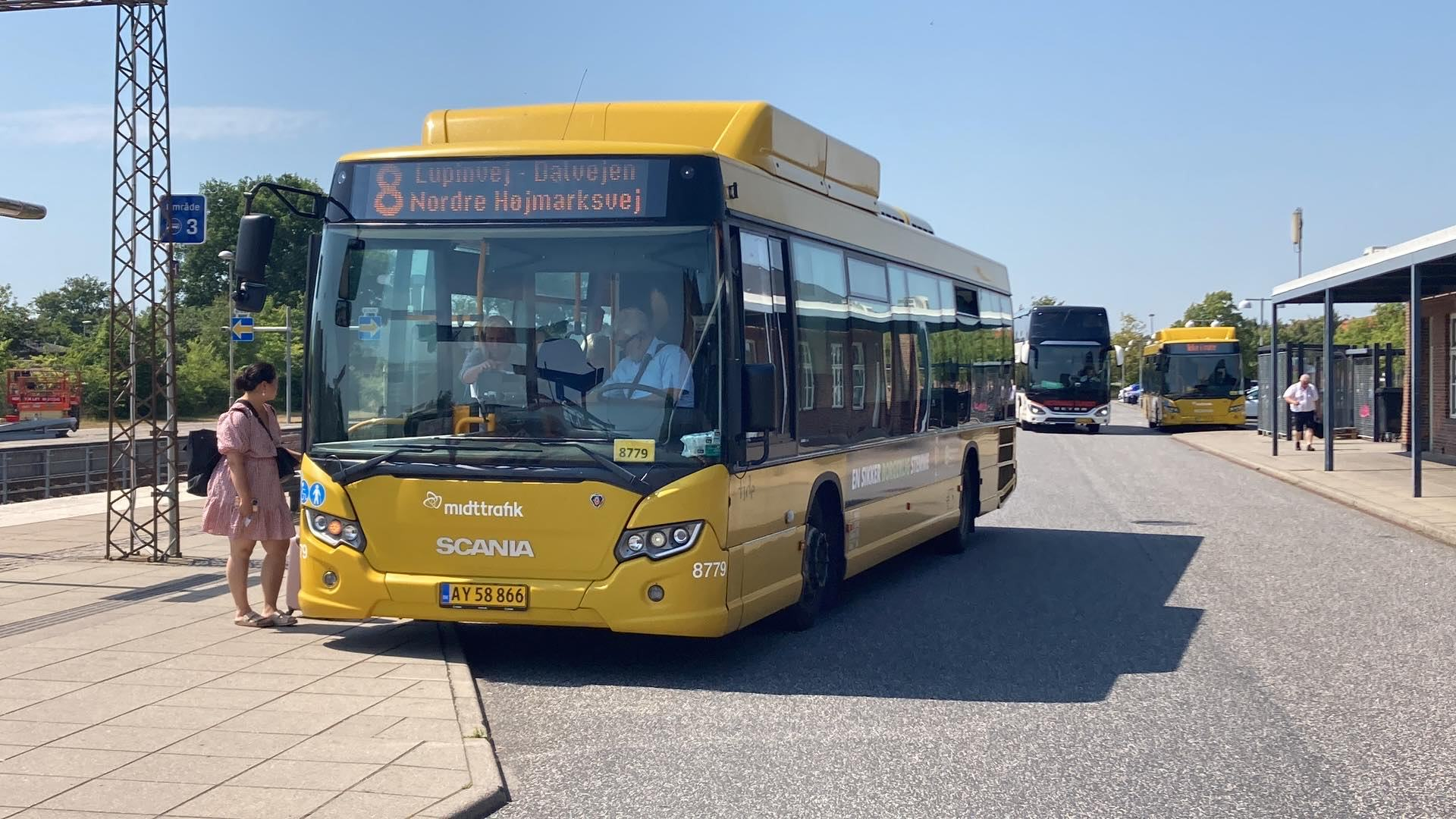
City bus at Silkeborg station in 2022.

Inside the station building there is a combined ticket office and convenience store operated by 7-Eleven, ticket machines, waiting room, lockers and toilets.

Immediately adjacent to the station is a large bus terminal. The station forecourt has a taxi stand, and the station has a bicycle parking station as well as a car park with approximately 140 parking spaces.

== Operations ==
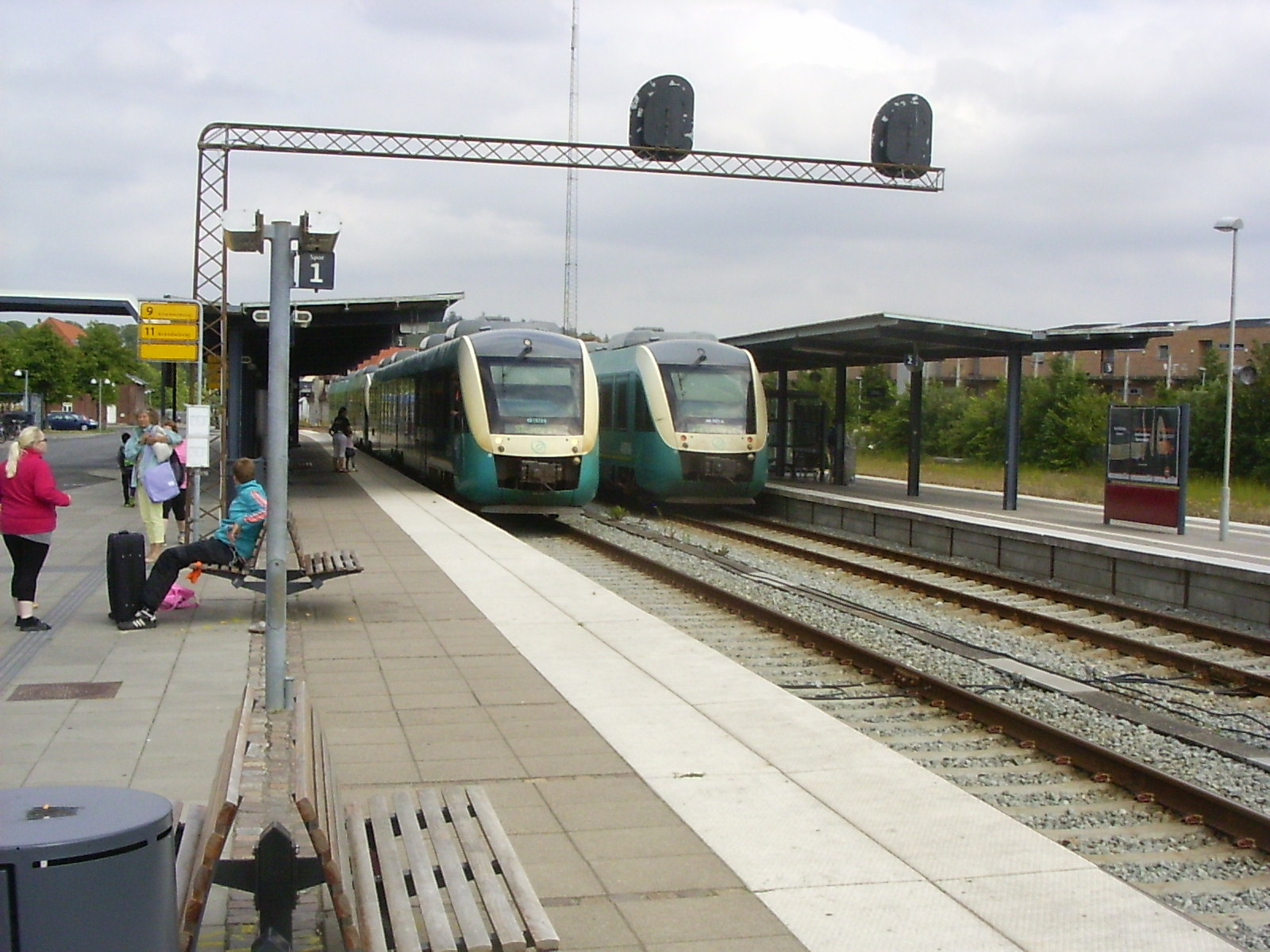
Trains at Silkeborg station in 2014.

The train services are currently operated by the private public transport operating company GoCollective which runs frequent direct regional train services from the station to Aarhus, Skanderborg, Herning, Struer and Skjern.

== Gallery ==
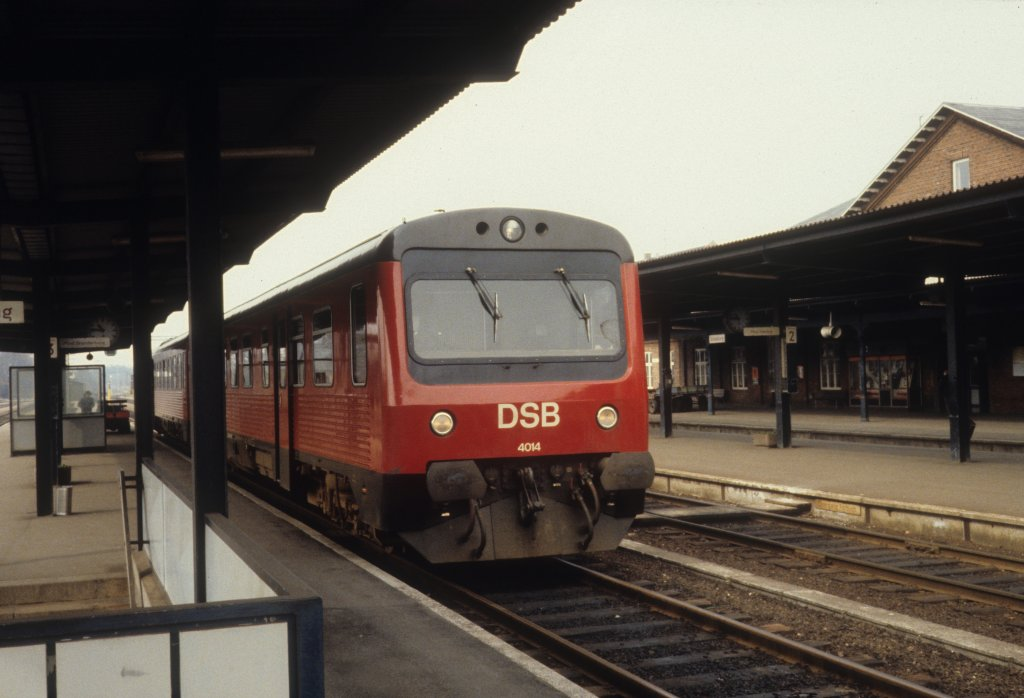
MR class DMU from DSB at Silkeborg station in 1979.

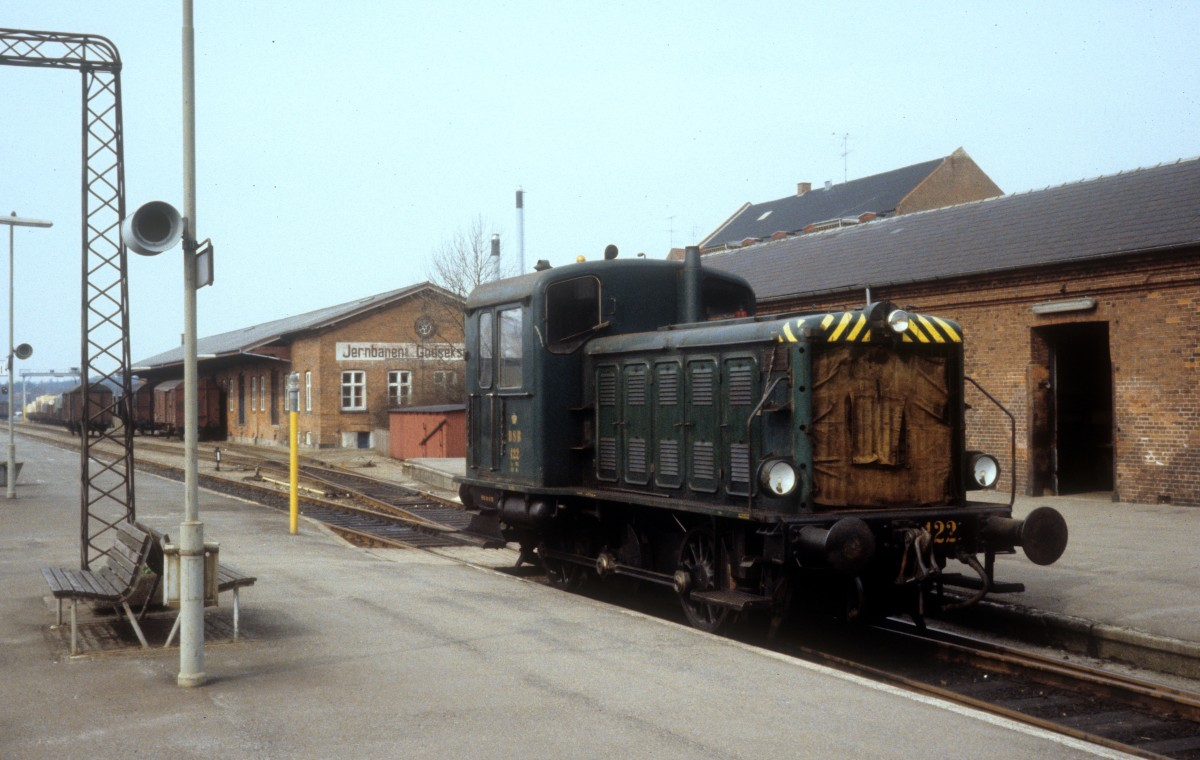
Frichs shunter locomotive from DSB at Silkeborg station in 1979.

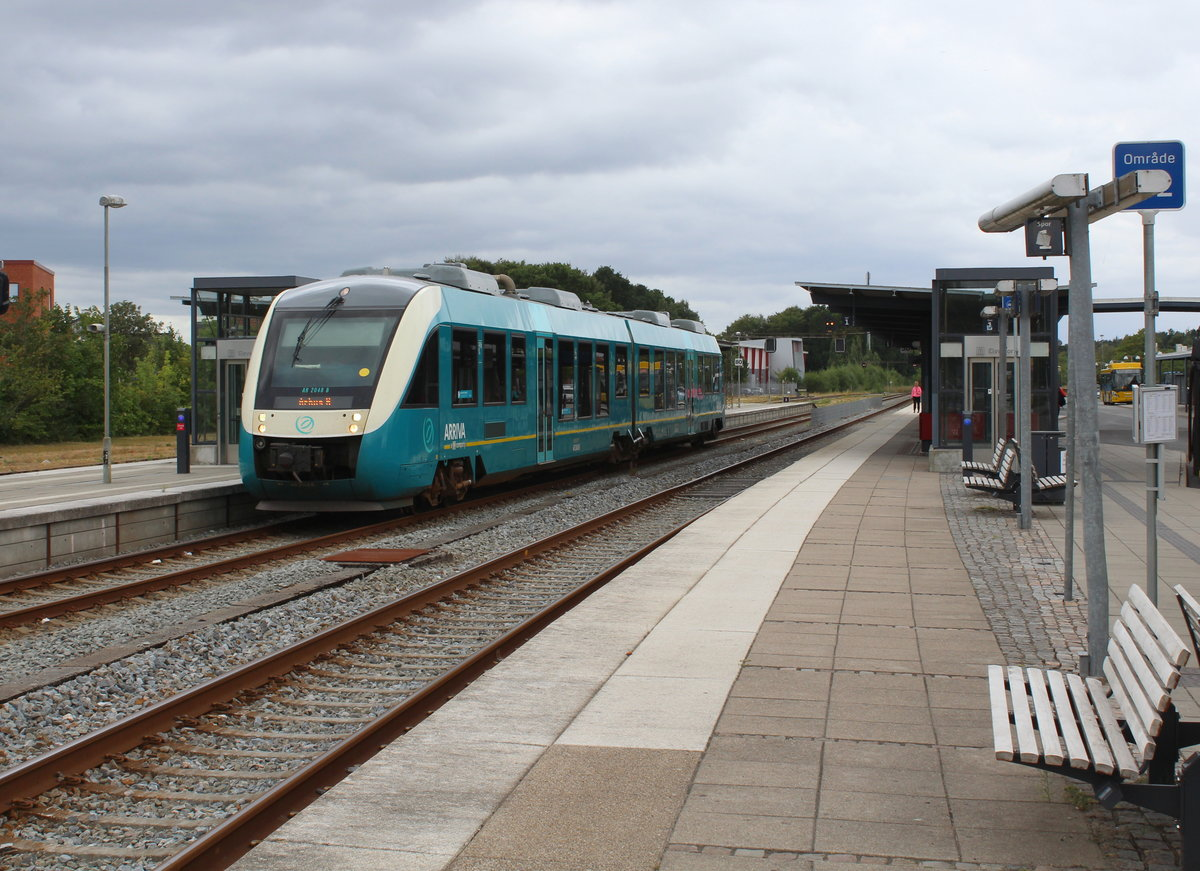
Alstom Coradia LINT 41 railcar from Arriva at Silkeborg station in 2018.

== See also ==
- List of railway stations in Denmark
- Rail transport in Denmark
- History of rail transport in Denmark
- Transport in Denmark
