= Svejbæk railway station =

Railway station in East Jutland, Denmark

Svejbæk
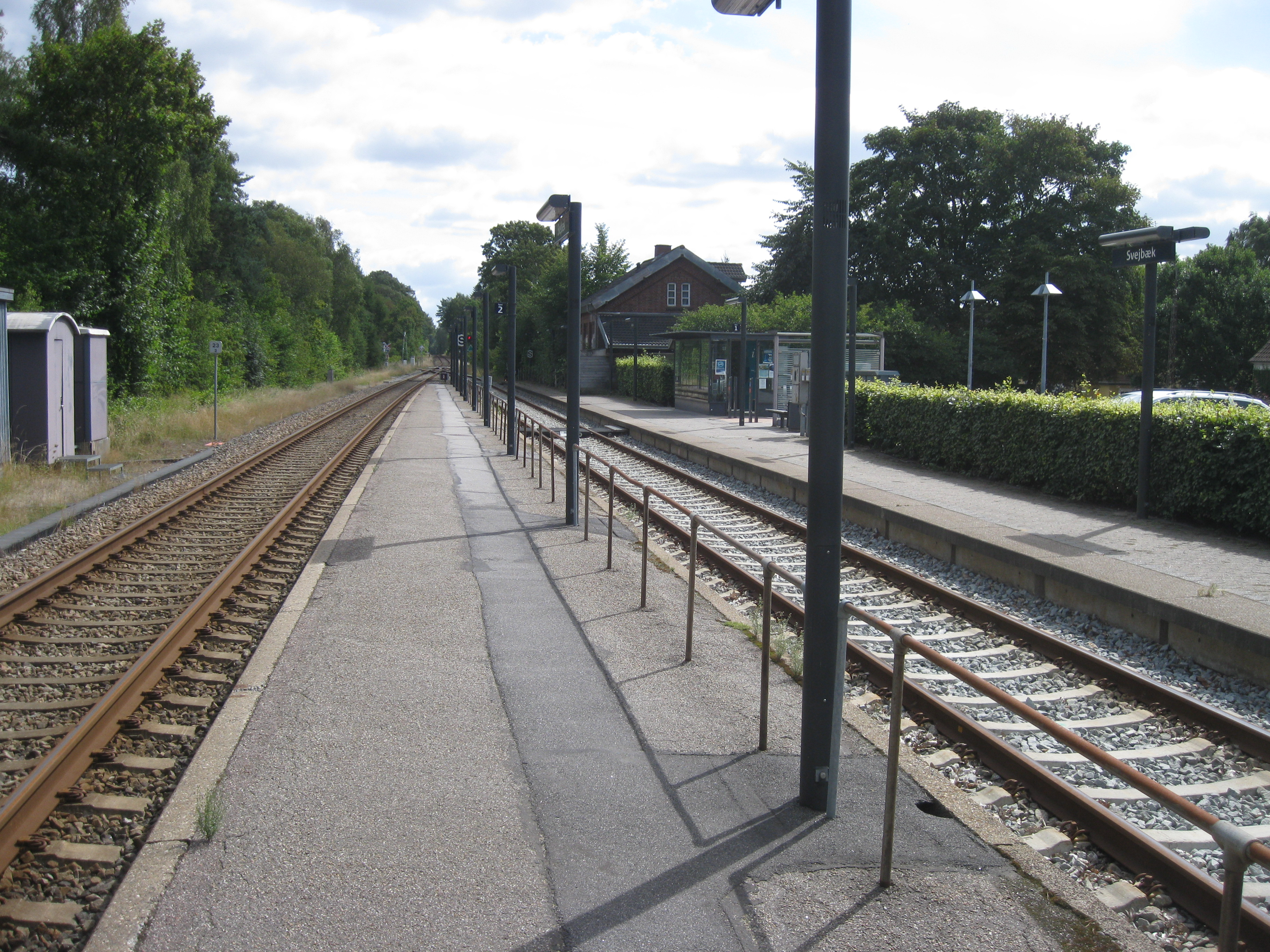
- Svejbæk station in 2014

General information
- Location: Julsøvænget 130; Svejbæk, 8600 Silkeborg; Silkeborg Municipality; Denmark
- Coordinates: 56°7′58″N 9°38′12″E
- Elevation: 28.6 metres (94 ft)
- Owner: Banedanmark
- Line: Skanderborg–Skjern railway line
- Platforms: 2
- Tracks: 2
- Train operators: GoCollective

Construction
- Architect: N.P.C. Holsøe

History
- Opened: 2 May 1871

Services
Preceding station	GoCollective	Following station
Silkeborg towards Skjern	Aarhus–Skjern Regional train	Laven towards Aarhus Central
Location

Svejbæk station is a railway station serving the railway town of Svejbæk in Central Jutland, Denmark.

The station is located on the Skanderborg–Skjern railway line from Skanderborg to Skjern. The station opened on 2 May 1871 with the Skanderborg-Silkeborg section of the Skanderborg-Skjern railway. The train services are currently operated by GoCollective which run frequent regional train services between Aarhus and Herning.

== History ==
Svejbæk station played a modest but locally significant role in the development of tourism in the Lake District of central Jutland during the late 19th and early 20th centuries. Situated near the lakes Julsø and Borre Sø, the station provided access to steamboat services and guesthouses that catered to travelers seeking leisure excursions in the Silkeborg area. The original railway halt was replaced around 1900 by a more substantial station facility located slightly northwest of the original site, reflecting increased passenger demand. Though the station building was later removed, the stop continued to serve as a regional link for nearby communities and visitors to the lake district.

== Architecture ==
The station building was designed by the Danish architect Niels Peder Christian Holsøe. The station building has later been torn down.

== See also ==
- List of railway stations in Denmark

== Bibliography ==
- Jensen, Niels (1978). Østjyske jernbaner (in Danish). Copenhagen: J.Fr. Clausens Forlag. ISBN 87-11-03852-7.
