= Sejs-Svejbæk =

- Town
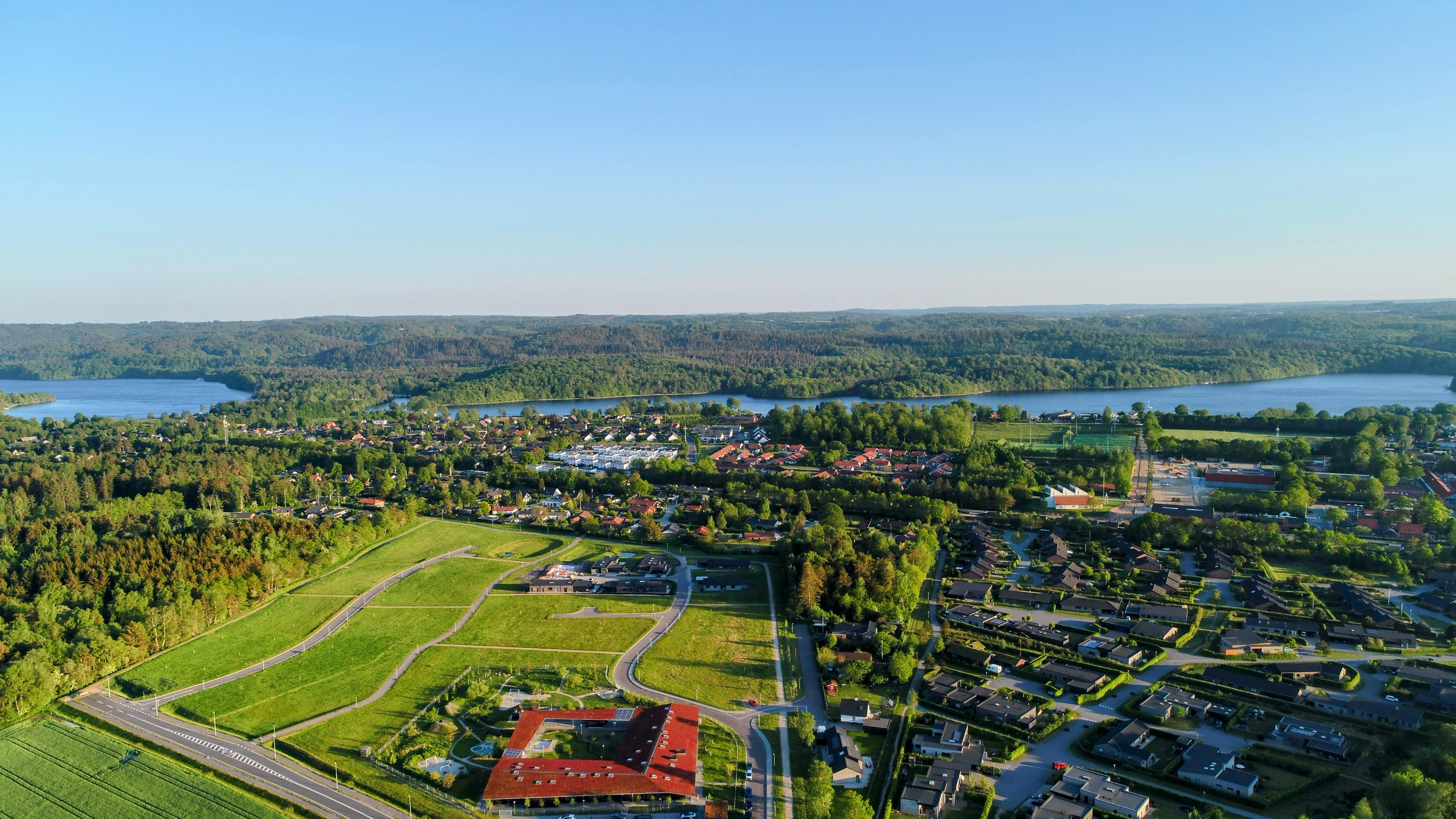
- View of Sejs-Svejbæk

- Location in Denmark Sejs-Svejbæk (Central Denmark Region)
- Coordinates: 56.13694°N 9.62251°E
- Country: Denmark
- Region: Central Jutland Region
- Municipality: Silkeborg Municipality

Area
  - Urban: 2.7 km^{2} (1.0 sq mi)

Population (2026)
  - Urban: 4,727
  - Urban density: 1,800/km^{2} (4,500/sq mi)
  - Gender: 2,302 males and 2,425 females
- Time zone: UTC+1 (CET)
  - Summer (DST): UTC+2 (CEST)
- Postal code: DK-8600 Silkeborg

Sejs-Svejbæk is a railway town, with a population of 4,727 (1 January 2026). It is located in Silkeborg Municipality, Central Jutland Region in Denmark, 7 km southeast of Silkeborg.

The area is served by Svejbæk railway station, located on the Skanderborg–Skjern railway line.

== Geography ==
The town is located in the Søhøjlandet region at the northern shore of Borre Lake. The lake is nestled between the two lakes of Brassø and Julsø, all of which are traversed by the Gudenå.

The two heather-clad peaks Sindbjerg and Stoubjerg are located just north of the town.

== Church ==
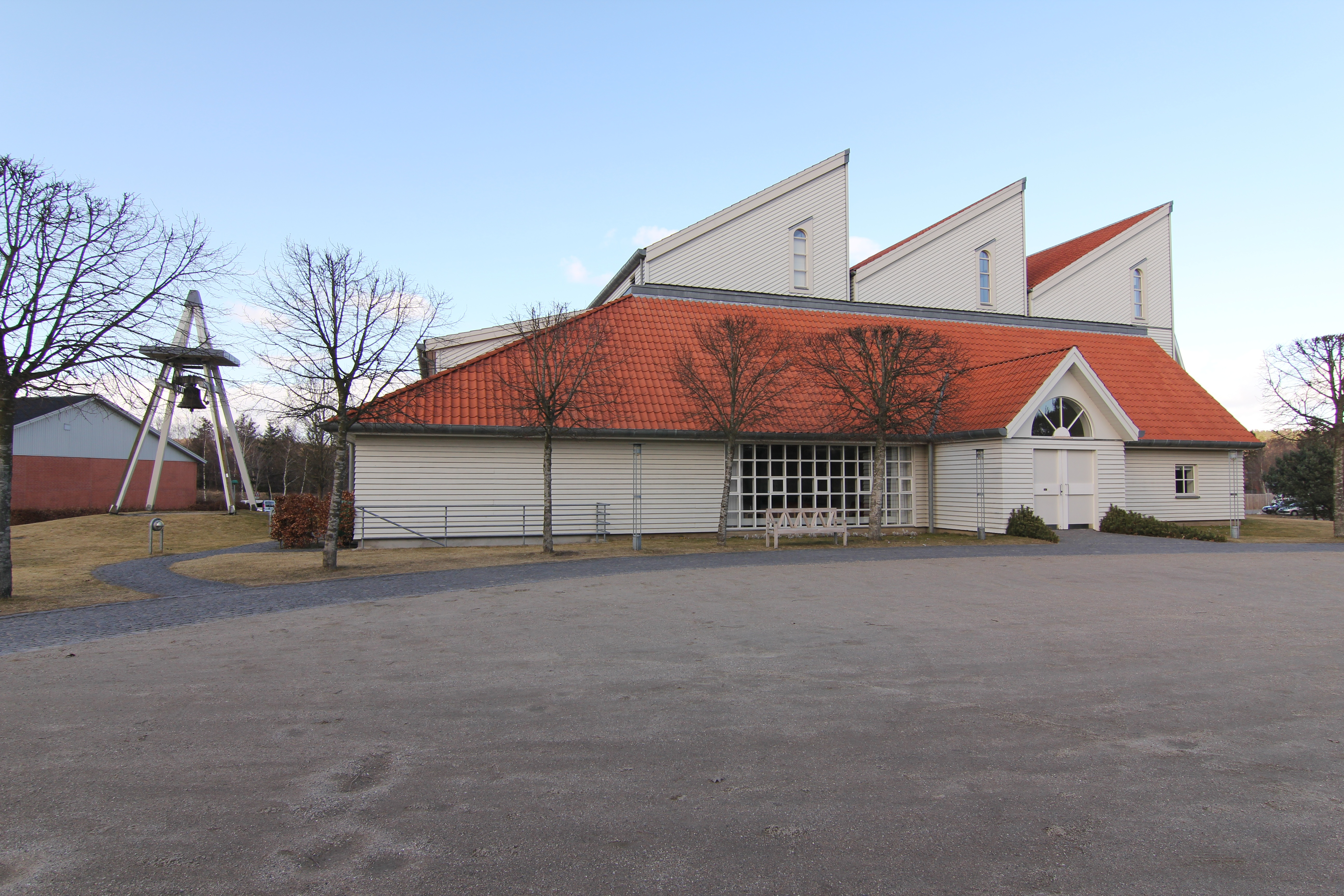
Sejs-Svejbæk Church

Sejs-Svejbæk Church, whose floor plan is modelled on a Roman bacilica with chancel, nave and aisles, was inaugurated in 1989.

== Notable people ==
- Lars Larsen, businessman, founder of Jysk, lived in Sejs-Svejbæk from 1982 until his death
- Esben Bjerre Hansen, radio and television personality
