= Ry railway station =

Railway station in East Jutland, Denmark

Ry
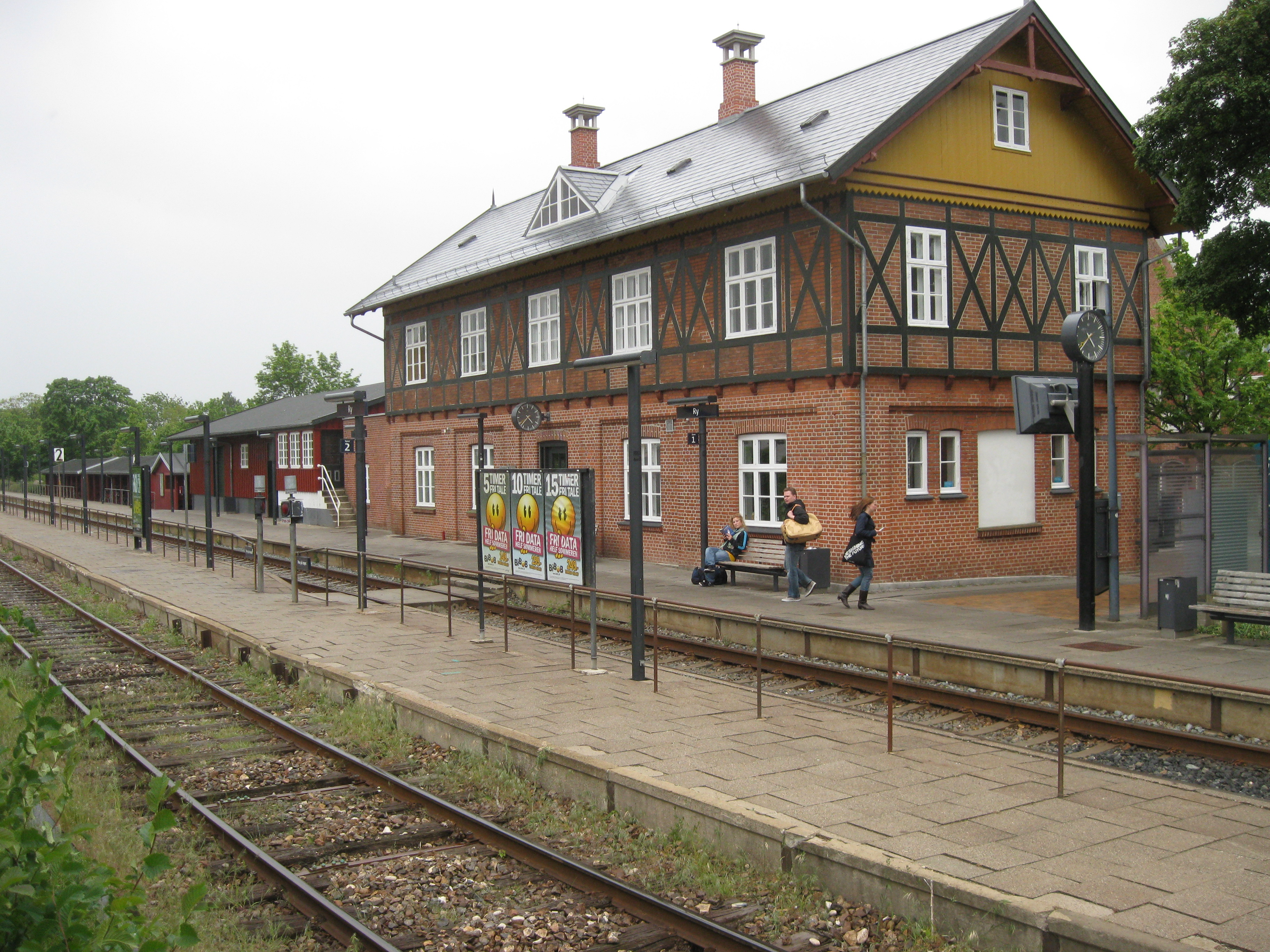
- Ry station in 2011

General information
- Location: Klostervej 3; 8680 Ry; Skanderborg Municipality; Denmark
- Coordinates: 56°5′27″N 9°45′32″E
- Elevation: 31.2 metres (102 ft)
- System: railway station
- Owner: DSB (station infrastructure); Banedanmark (rail infrastructure)
- Line: Skanderborg-Skjern Line
- Platforms: 2
- Tracks: 2
- Train operators: GoCollective

Construction
- Architect: N.P.C. Holsøe; Heinrich Wenck; Knud Tanggaard Seest

History
- Opened: 2 May 1871

Services
Preceding station	GoCollective	Following station
Laven towards Skjern	Aarhus–Skjern Regional train	Alken towards Aarhus Central
Location
- Location within Denmark Location within Central Denmark Region

Ry station is a railway station serving the railway town of Ry in the Søhøjlandet (English: the Lake-highland) area of Central Jutland, Denmark. The station is situated in the centre of the town, and c. 5 km (3.1 mi) east of the original town of Rye which is now much smaller than the railway town.

The station is located on the Skanderborg–Skjern railway line from Skanderborg to Skjern. The station opened on 2 May 1871 with the Skanderborg-Silkeborg section of the Skanderborg-Skjern railway. The train services are currently operated by GoCollective which run frequent regional train services between Aarhus and Herning.

== Architecture ==
The station building was designed by the Danish architect Niels Peder Christian Holsøe. It was later rebuilt by the Danish railway architects Heinrich Wenck and Knud Tanggaard Seest.

== Gallery ==
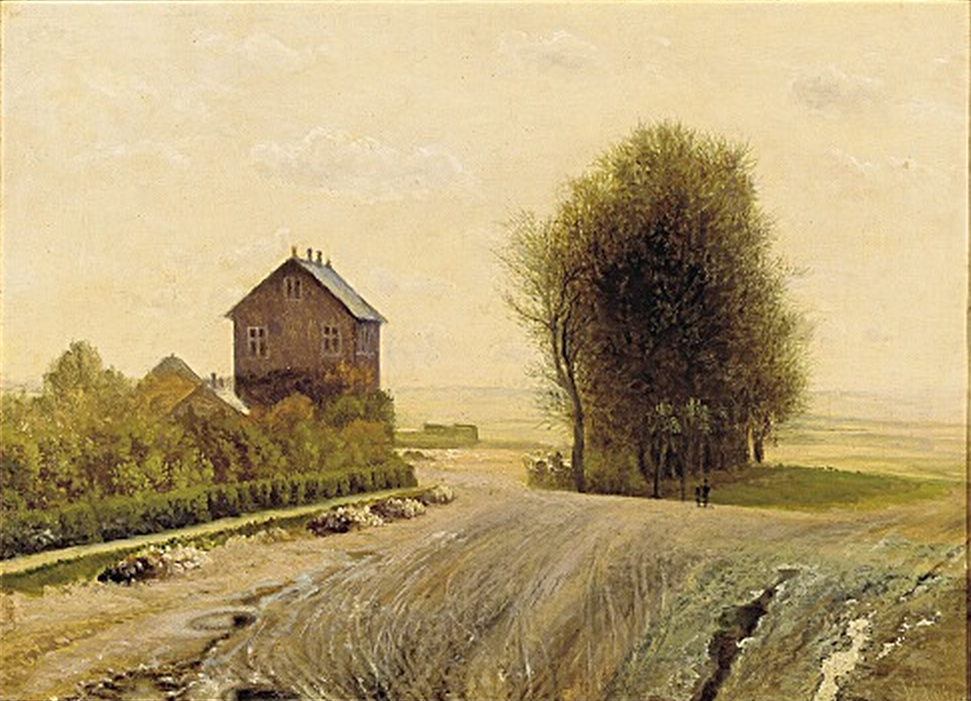
Ry station at the end of the 20th century. Painting by Vilhelm Kyhn.

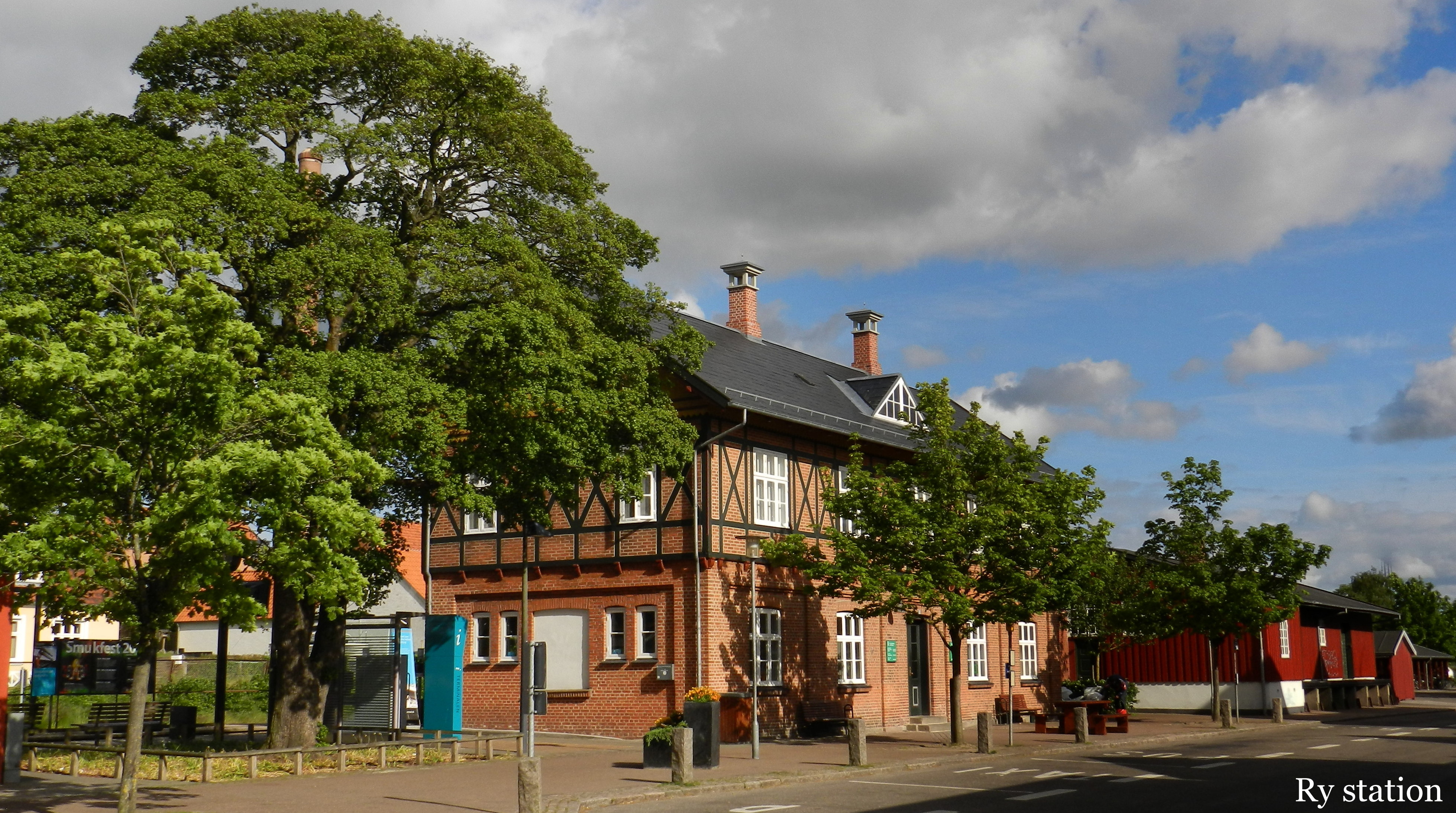
Station building of Ry station in 2012

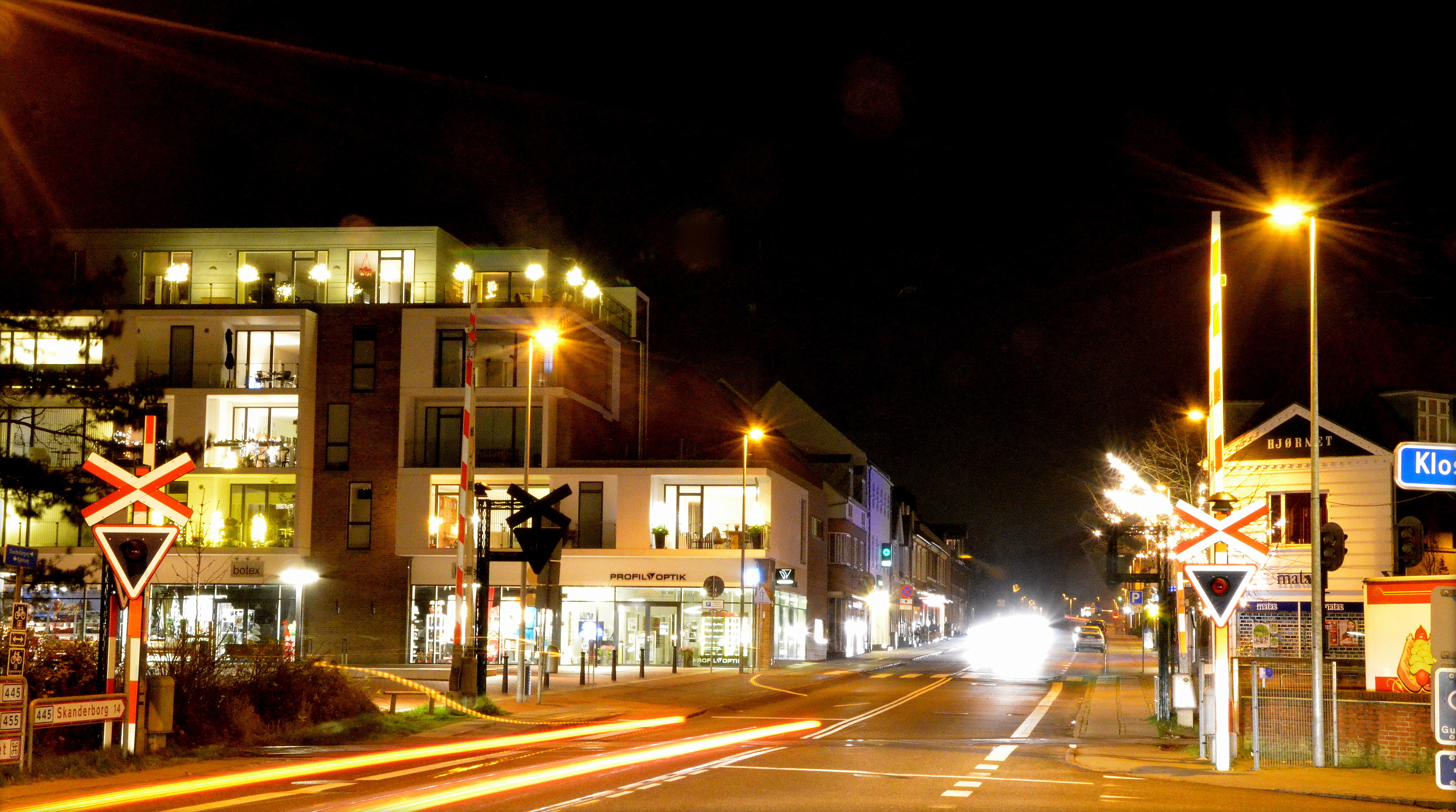
Level crossing at Ry station in 2012

== See also ==
- List of railway stations in Denmark
- Rail transport in Denmark
