= Alken railway station, Denmark =

Railway station in East Jutland, Denmark

Alken
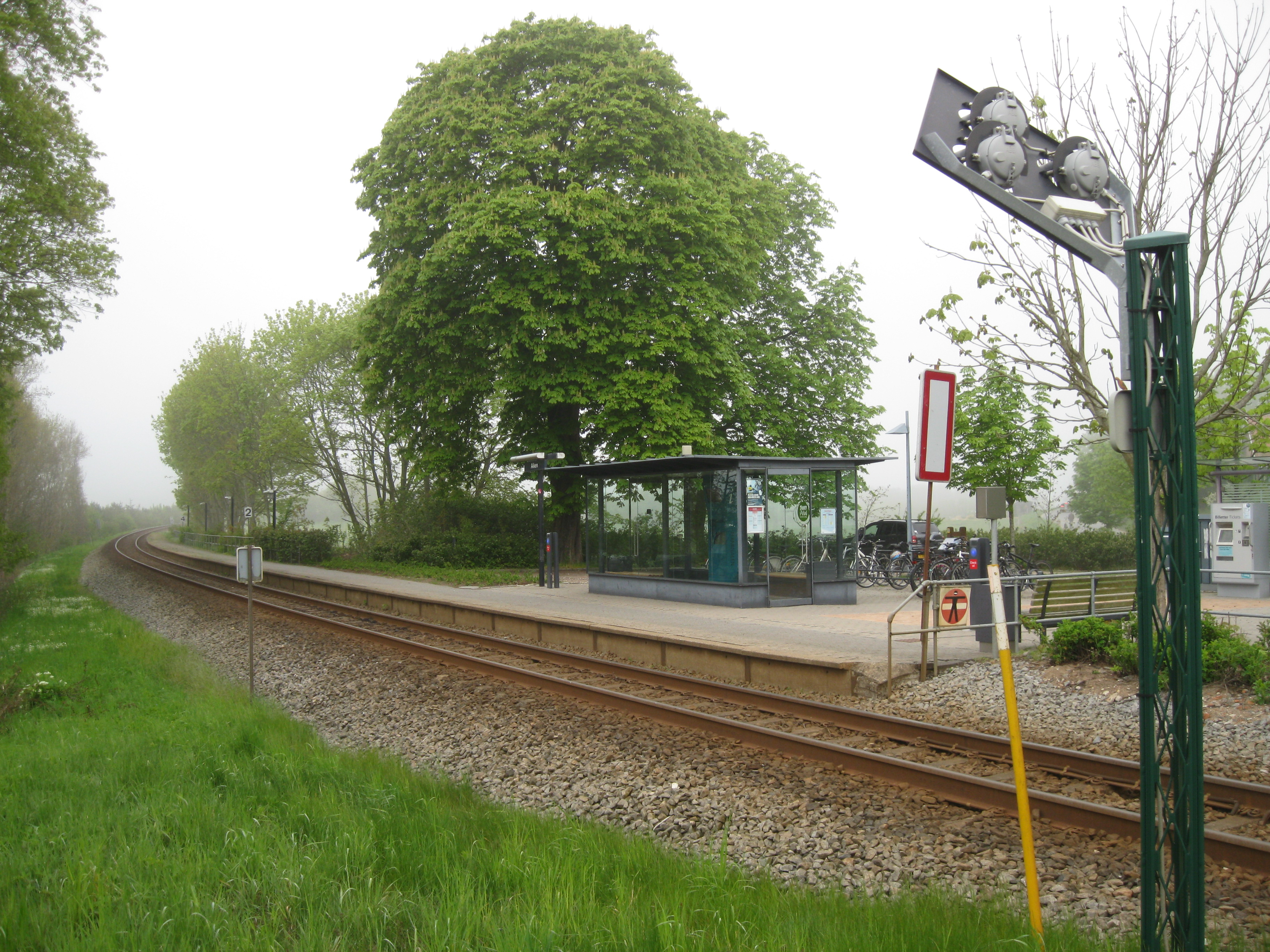
- Alken station in 2015

General information
- Location: Alkenvej 44; Alken, 8680 Ry; Skanderborg Municipality; Denmark
- Coordinates: 56°3′5″N 9°50′50″E
- Elevation: 28.9 metres (95 ft)
- System: railway station
- Owner: Banedanmark
- Line: Skanderborg–Skjern
- Platforms: 1 side platform
- Tracks: 1
- Train operators: DSB

Construction
- Architect: Niels Peder Christian Holsøe

Other information
- Station code: Ak
- Website: Official website

History
- Opened: 2 May 1871; 155 years ago

Services
Preceding station	DSB Vores Tog	Following station
Ry towards Skjern	Aarhus–Skjern Regional train	Skanderborg towards Aarhus Central
Location
- Location within Denmark Location within Central Denmark Region

Alken station is a railway station serving the village of Alken in East Jutland, Denmark. The station is located in the centre of the village a short distance from the Mossø lake in the Søhøjlandet (English: the Lake-highland) area of Central Jutland.

The station is located on the Skanderborg–Skjern railway line from Skanderborg to Skjern. The train services are currently operated by the national railway company DSB which run frequent regional train services between Aarhus and Herning. The station opened on 2 May 1871 with the Skanderborg-Silkeborg section of the Skanderborg-Skjern railway. Its small station building built to designs by the Danish architect Niels Peder Christian Holsøe (1826–1895) was torn down in 1979.

== See also ==
- List of railway stations in Denmark
- Rail transport in Denmark
