= Laven railway station =

Railway station in East Jutland, Denmark

Laven
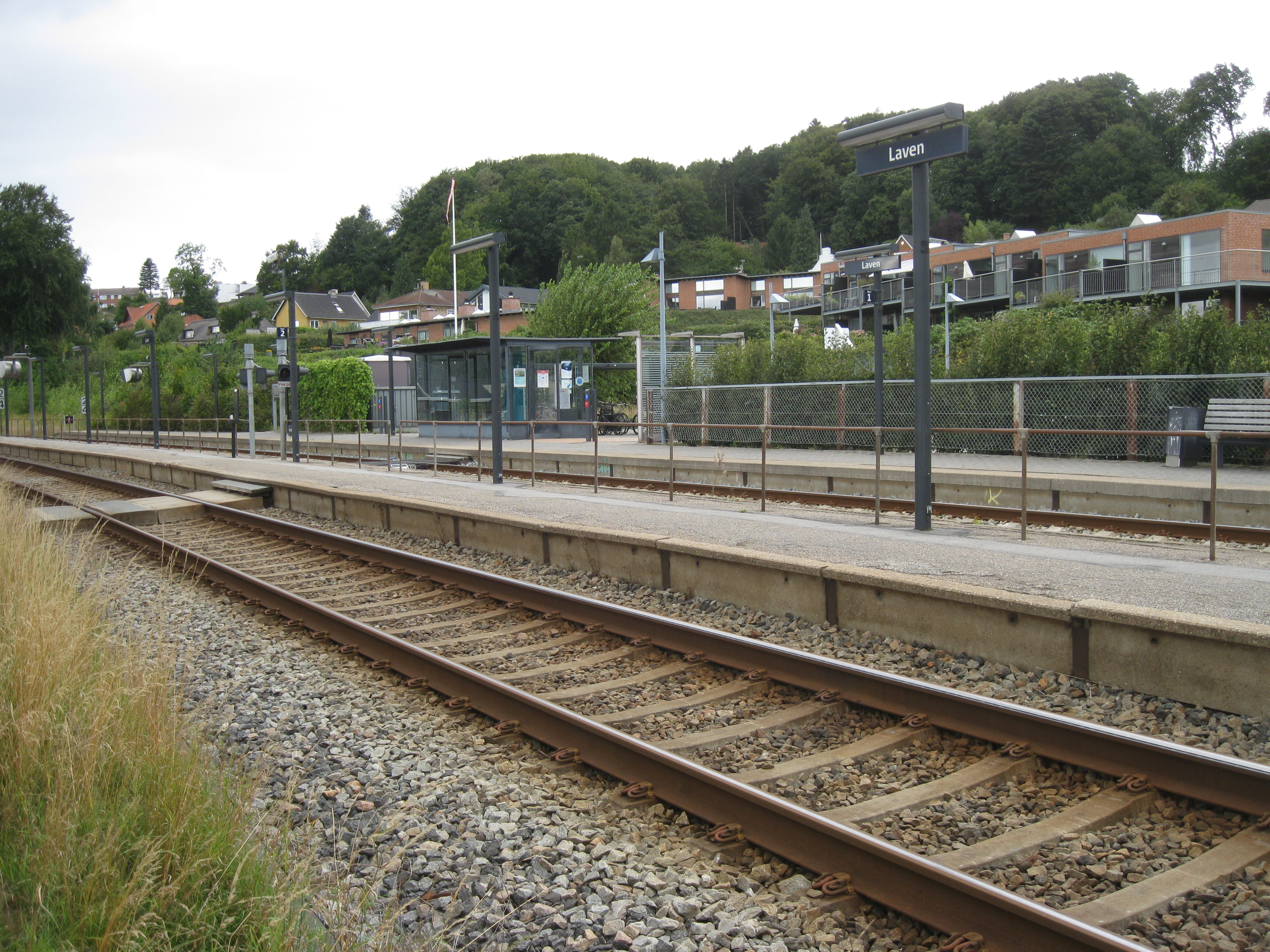
- Laven station in 2014

General information
- Location: Himmelbjergvej 106R; Laven, 8600 Silkeborg; Silkeborg Municipality; Denmark
- Coordinates: 56°7′29″N 9°43′3″E
- Elevation: 25.0 metres (82.0 ft)
- Owner: Banedanmark
- Line: Skanderborg–Skjern
- Platforms: 2
- Tracks: 2
- Train operators: GoCollective

Construction
- Architect: N.P.C. Holsøe

History
- Opened: 2 May 1871

Services
Preceding station	GoCollective	Following station
Svejbæk towards Skjern	Aarhus–Skjern Regional train	Ry towards Aarhus Central
Location

Laven station is a railway station serving the railway town of Laven in East Jutland, Denmark.

The station is located on the Skanderborg–Skjern railway line from Skanderborg to Skjern. The station opened on 2 May 1871 with the Skanderborg-Silkeborg section of the Skanderborg-Skjern railway. The train services are currently operated by GoCollective which run frequent regional train services between Aarhus and Herning.

== Architecture ==
The station building was designed by the Danish architect Niels Peder Christian Holsøe. The station building has later been torn down.

== See also ==
- List of railway stations in Denmark
- Rail transport in Denmark
