= Monte Carlo (radio programme) =

Danish radio program

Monte Carlo was a Danish radio programme that was broadcast on the national Danish Radio (DR) channel DR P3. It was hosted by two radio personalities; Esben Bjerre Hansen and Peter Falktoft. The programme was originally broadcast between 9.00 and 12.00 a.m. each Sunday, which was later changed when airtime was moved to 2-4 p.m. on all working days. The programme contained different features ranging from quizzes to satirical inputs, including (translated) "The Quotation Index", "The Per Wimmer Quiz", "The Mystical Mr. Mox Quiz" and "Heard over the hedge" (#hørtoverhækken). The radio personalities often made fun of a select group of Danish celebrities and politicians, most noticeably the Danish producer, composer and songwriter Remee, the Danish professional road bicycle racer Rolf Sørensen and the Danish politician Simon Emil Ammitzbøl.

In 2012, Monte Carlo was a part of DR's coverage of the United States presidential election, sending from Miami, Florida, from 29 October to 7 November 2012.

In a big poll by DR, Esben Bjerre Hansen and Peter Falktoft were proposed as hosts for the Eurovision Song Contest 2014 held in the Danish capital, Copenhagen, with the two radio personalities receiving a substantial number of votes, although they were superseded by Nikolaj Koppel, Pilou Asbæk and Lise Rønne.
