= Esben Bjerre Hansen =

Danish radio and television host (born 1987)

Esben Bjerre Hansen (born 8 February 1987 in Sejs, Silkeborg) is a Danish radio and television host, best known for his job as radio host in the popular radio programme Monte Carlo at DR P3 along with his co-host Peter Falktoft. He went to the Danish School of Media and Journalism in Aarhus until 2013. In 2011, he had a short stay on the San Francisco State University, which ended when he was offered job at DR P3.

Since 2009, Bjerre Hansen has been employed by the Danish Broadcasting Corporation (DR). First, he was attended at the Radio News and DR2 Deadline, until he in 2012 was hired to Monte Carlo on DR P3. In 2012 and 2013 he has, along with Peter Falktoft, won the EkstraBladet "Golden Microphone" and "Årets Drivetime Radio" at Prix Radio. In 2013, they won a Zulu Award for the years best radio programme.

In February 2013, he had television debut with "Monte Carlo loves Putin", which was nominated for a Zulu Award for "Best Original Danish TV program".

In February 2015, he co-hosted the Dansk Melodi Grand Prix 2015, the Danish selection for the Eurovision Song Contest 2015 along with Jacob Riising.
