= Listed buildings in Silkeborg Municipality =

This is a list of listed buildings in Silkeborg Municipality, Denmark.

== The list ==
Listing name	Image	Location	Year built	source
Aunsbjerg		Aunsbjergvej 2A, 8620 Kjellerup	c. 1550	740-26408-1
Fischer's Hospital		Erik Glippings Vej 1, 8643 Ans By	1778	Ref
Grønbæk Rectory		Præstevangen 39, 8643 Ans By	1757	740-33150-1
Railway bridges across Remstrup Å		Sejsvej 0, 8600 Silkeborg		Ref
Liselund		Aunsbjergvej 6, 8620 Kjellerup		Ref
Marsvinslund		Marsvinslundvej 10A, 8620 Kjellerup		740-28492-1
Silkeborg Manor		Hovedgårdsvej 7, 8600 Silkeborg		740-9096-1
Silkeborg Old Town Hall		Torvet 2A, 8600 Silkeborg	1957	740-15947-1
Silkeborg Watertower		Amaliegade 49, 8600 Silkeborg	10o2	740-21271-1
Vinderslevholm		Vinderslevholmvej 56A & B, 8620 Kjellerup	c. 1550	Ref
