= Skanderborg–Skjern railway line =

Railway line in Jutland, Denmark

Coordinates: 56°09′14″N 9°22′41″E

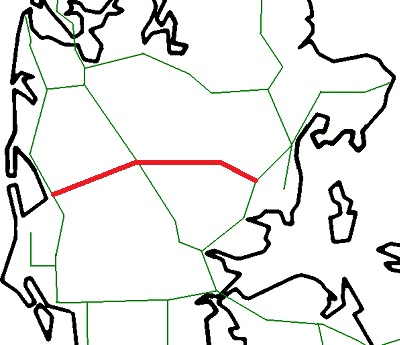

Overview
- Native name: Skanderborg–Skjern banen
- Status: Active
- Owner: Banedanmark
- Termini: Skanderborg station; Skjern station
- Stations: 18

Service
- Type: Main line
- System: Danish railways
- Operator: Arriva

History
- Opened: 2 May 1871 (Skanderborg–Silkeborg); 28 August 1877 (Silkeborg–Herning); 1 October 1881 (Herning–Skjern)

Technical
- Line length: 111.9 kilometres (69.5 mi)
- Number of tracks: Single
- Character: Passenger trains Freight trains
- Track gauge: 1,435 mm (4 ft 8 1/2 in)
- Electrification: None
- Operating speed: 120 km/h (75 mph) (Skanderborg–Silkeborg); 100 km/h (62 mph) (Silkeborg–Skjern)
Route map
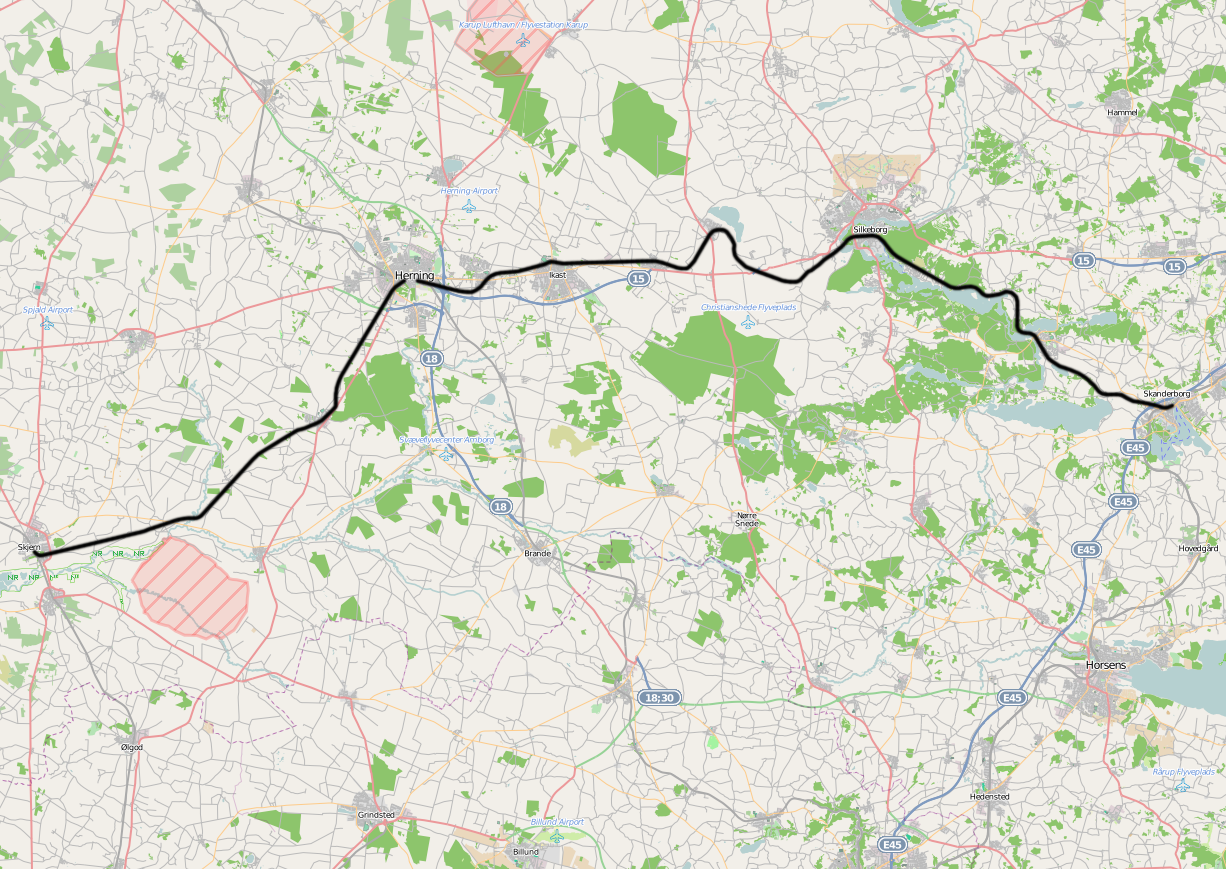

The Skanderborg–Skjern railway line (Danish: Skanderborg–Skjern–banen) is a 111.9 km (69.5 mi) long standard gauge single track railway line in Denmark which runs between the cities of Skanderborg and Skjern in Central Jutland, Denmark.

The railway opened in sections. The section from Skanderborg to Silkeborg opened in 1871, the section from Silkeborg to Herning in 1877, and the section from Herning to Skjern in 1881. The line is owned and maintained by Rail Net Denmark and served with passenger trains by the railway company Arriva.

== Stations ==
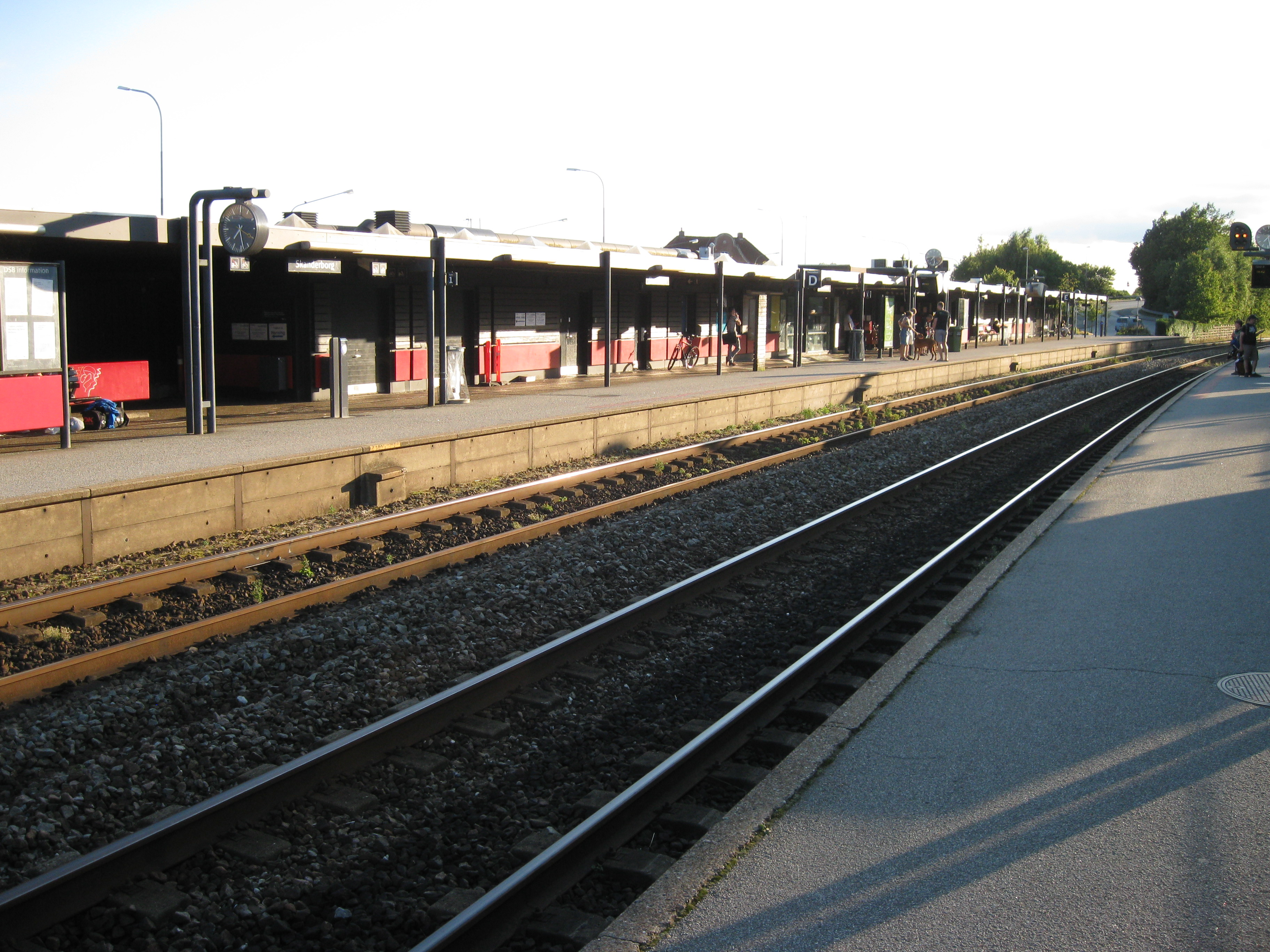
Skanderborg station

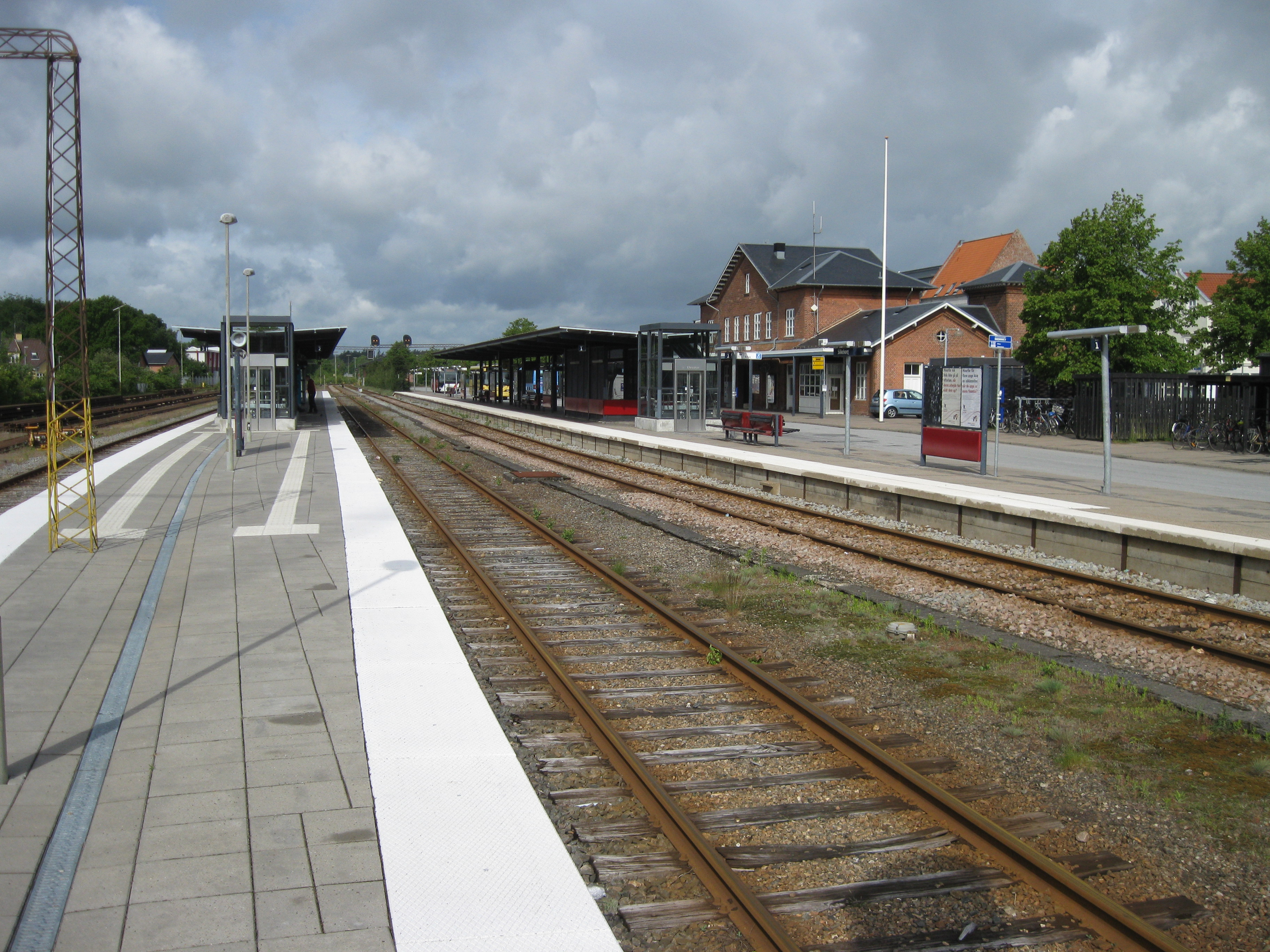
Silkeborg station

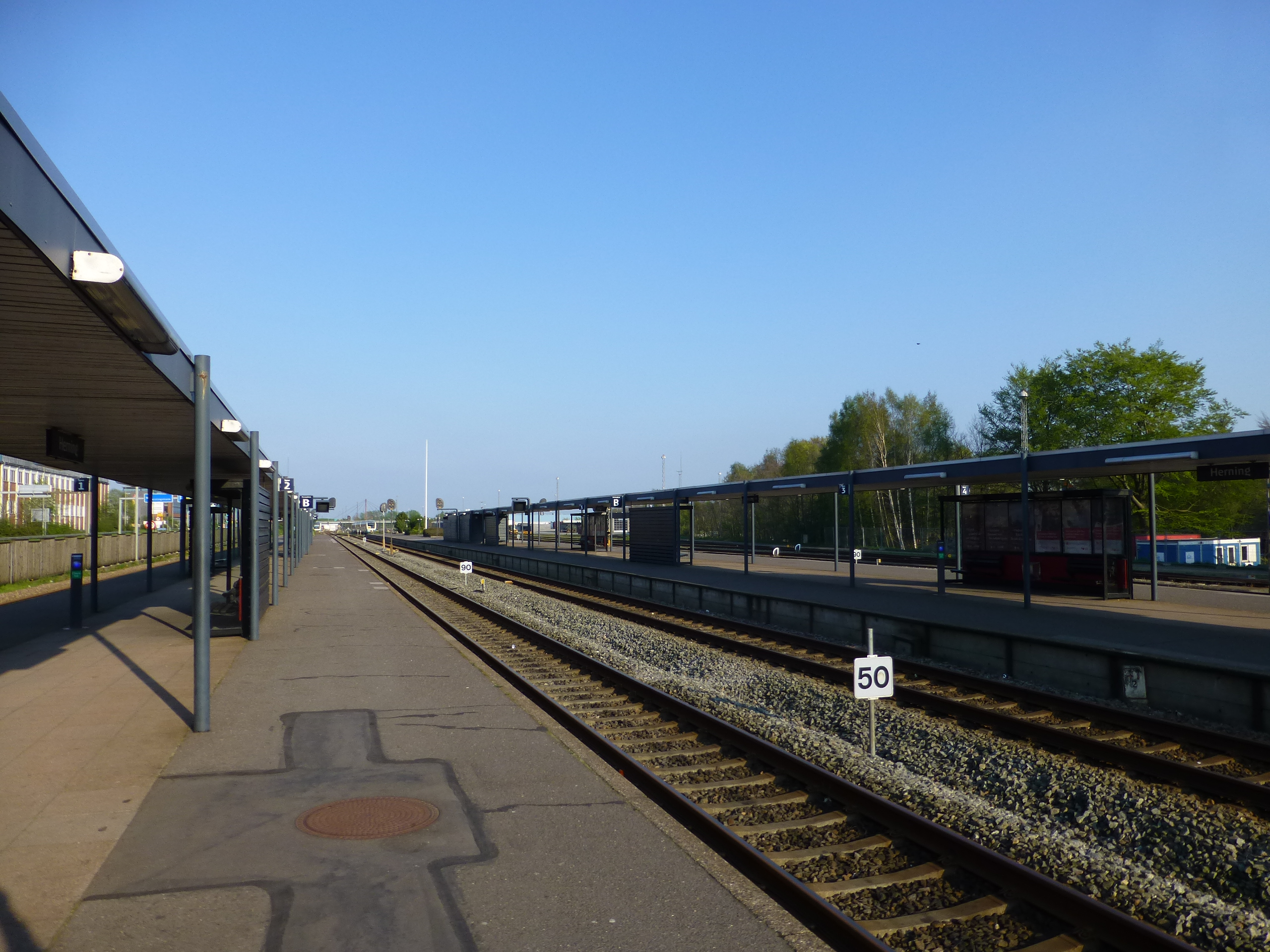
Herning station

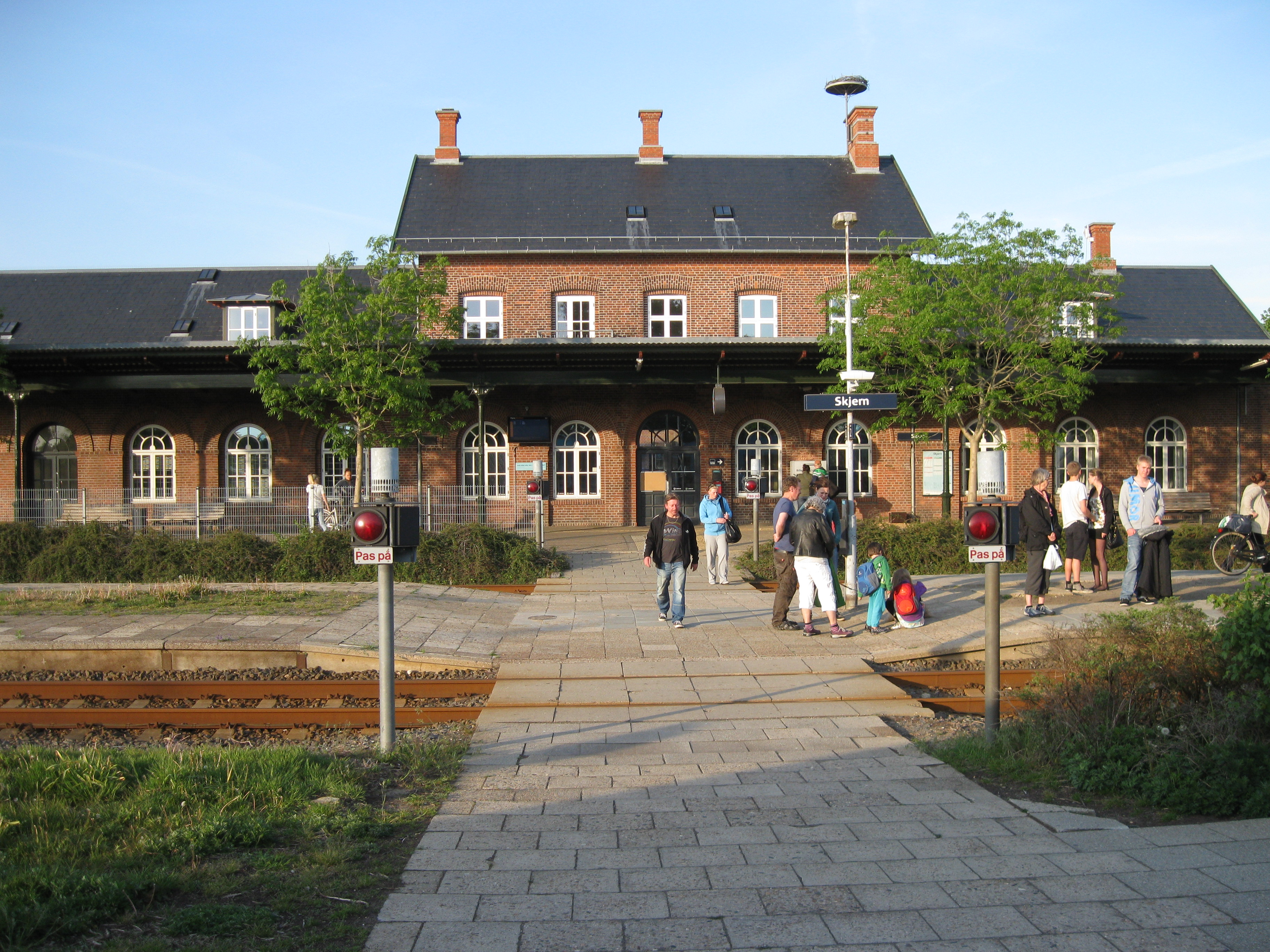
Skjern station

- Skanderborg
- Alken
- Ry
- Laven
- Svejbæk
- Silkeborg
- Engesvang
- Bording
- Ikast
- Hammerum
- Birk Centerpark
- Herning
- Herning Messecenter
- Studsgård
- Kibæk
- Troldhede
- Borris
- Skjern
