= Niels Peder Christian Holsøe =

Danish architect

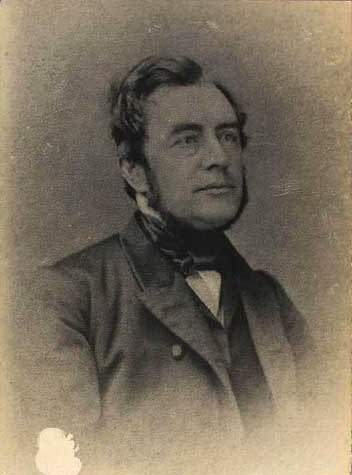
- Born: 27 November 1826; Øster Egesborg, Denmark
- Died: 1 January 1895 (aged 68); Copenhagen, Denmark
- Occupation: Architect
- Buildings: Helsingør Station

Niels Peder Christian Holsøe (27 November 1826 – 1 January 1895) was a Danish architect, known for the numerous railway stations he designed across Denmark in his capacity of head architect of the Danish State Railways.

== Biography ==
Holsøe was born at Øster Egesborg near Vordingborg on the island of Zealand, Denmark. He was the son of pastor Lauritz Christian Holsøe (1789-1862) and Vilhelmine Euphrosyne Margrethe, née Feddersen (1797-1871). He was initially trained as a mason, and later was a private student of Gustav Friedrich Hetsch (1788–1864). Afterwards he attended the Royal Danish Academy of Fine Arts building school and ornament school from 1842 to 1849 and again from 1851 to 1852, interrupted by his participation in the First Schleswig War.

He designed a number of public buildings, especially railway stations in cities including Nyborg (1865), Silkeborg (1871), Varde (1874), Ringkøbing (1875), Ribe (1883), Svendborg (1876), Aarhus East (1877), Thisted (1881), Faaborg (1882), Assens (1883–84) and Helsingør (with Heinrich Wenck; 1889–91). In addition, he designed the Hotel Marienlyst in Helsingør (1860–61), and Ugerløse Church (1875-76), and was responsible for the renovation of Aarhus Hospital (1878–89).

From 1891, when Holsøe was afflicted with an eye disease, Heinrich Wenck gradually took over some of his responsibilities with title of First Architect, before succeeding Holsøe as Chief Architect in 1894. Holsøe died aged 68 on 1 January 1895 in Copenhagen. He is buried at Frederiksberg Ældre Kirkegård.

== Gallery ==
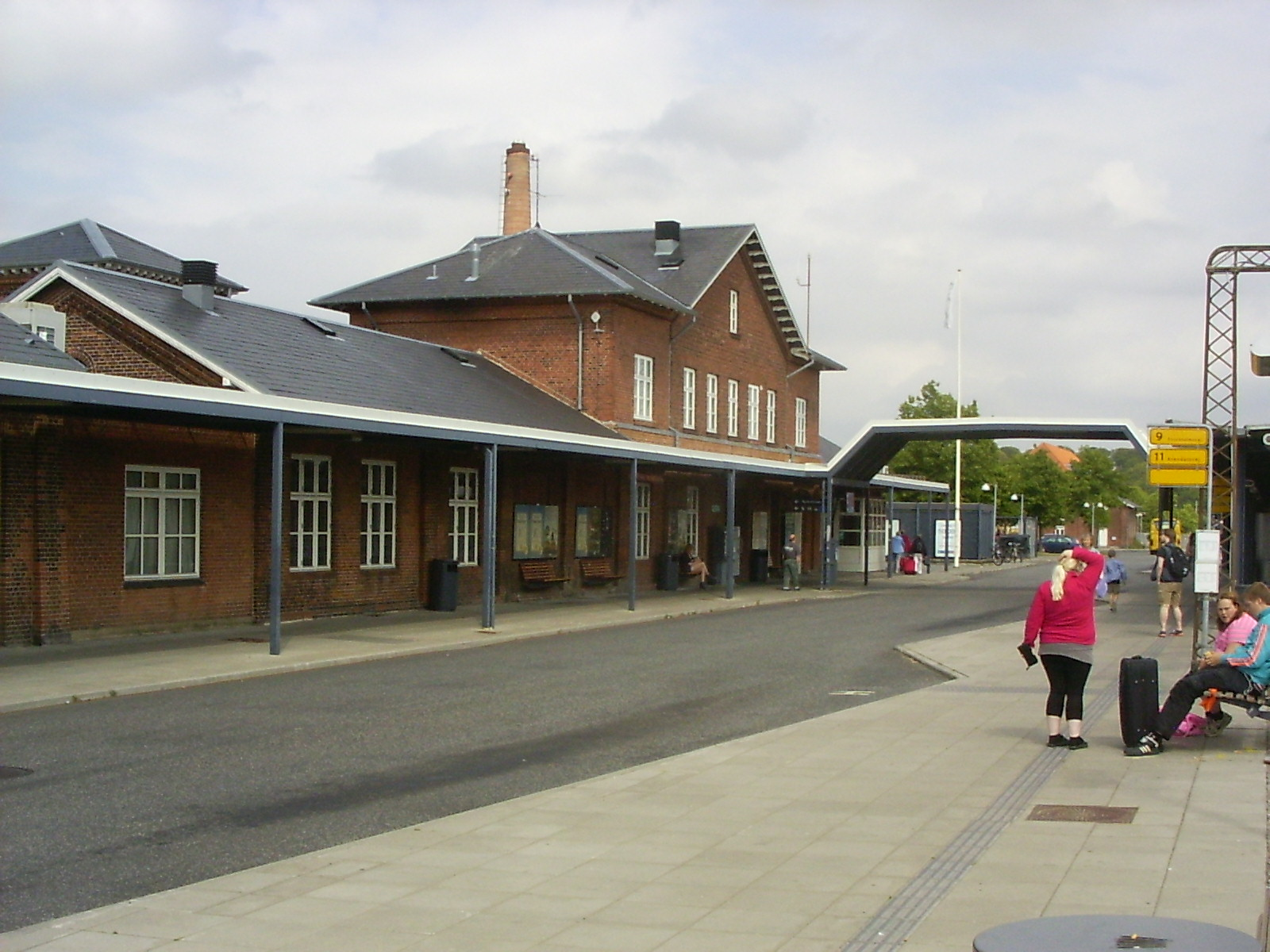
Silkeborg railway station

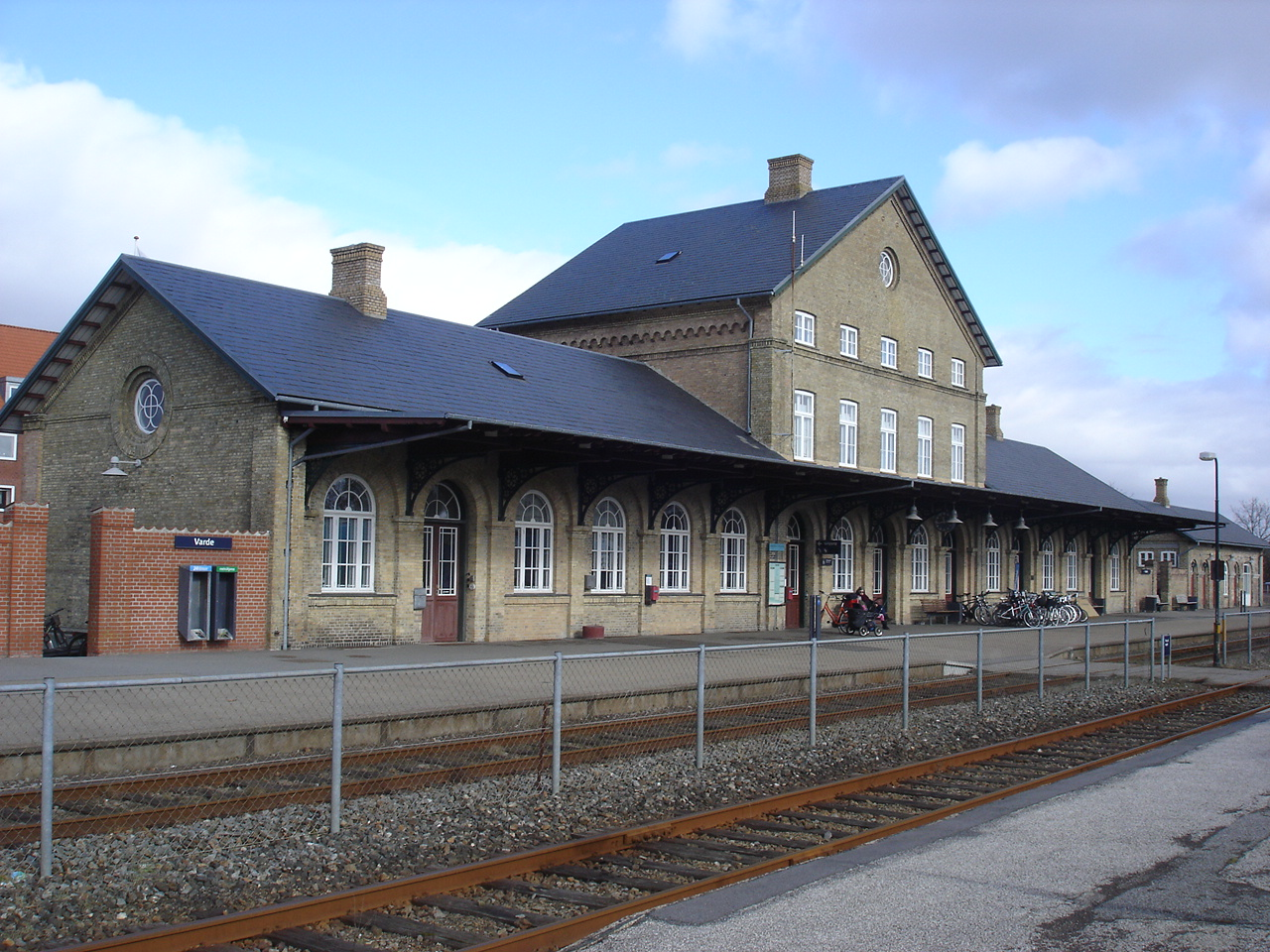
Varde railway station

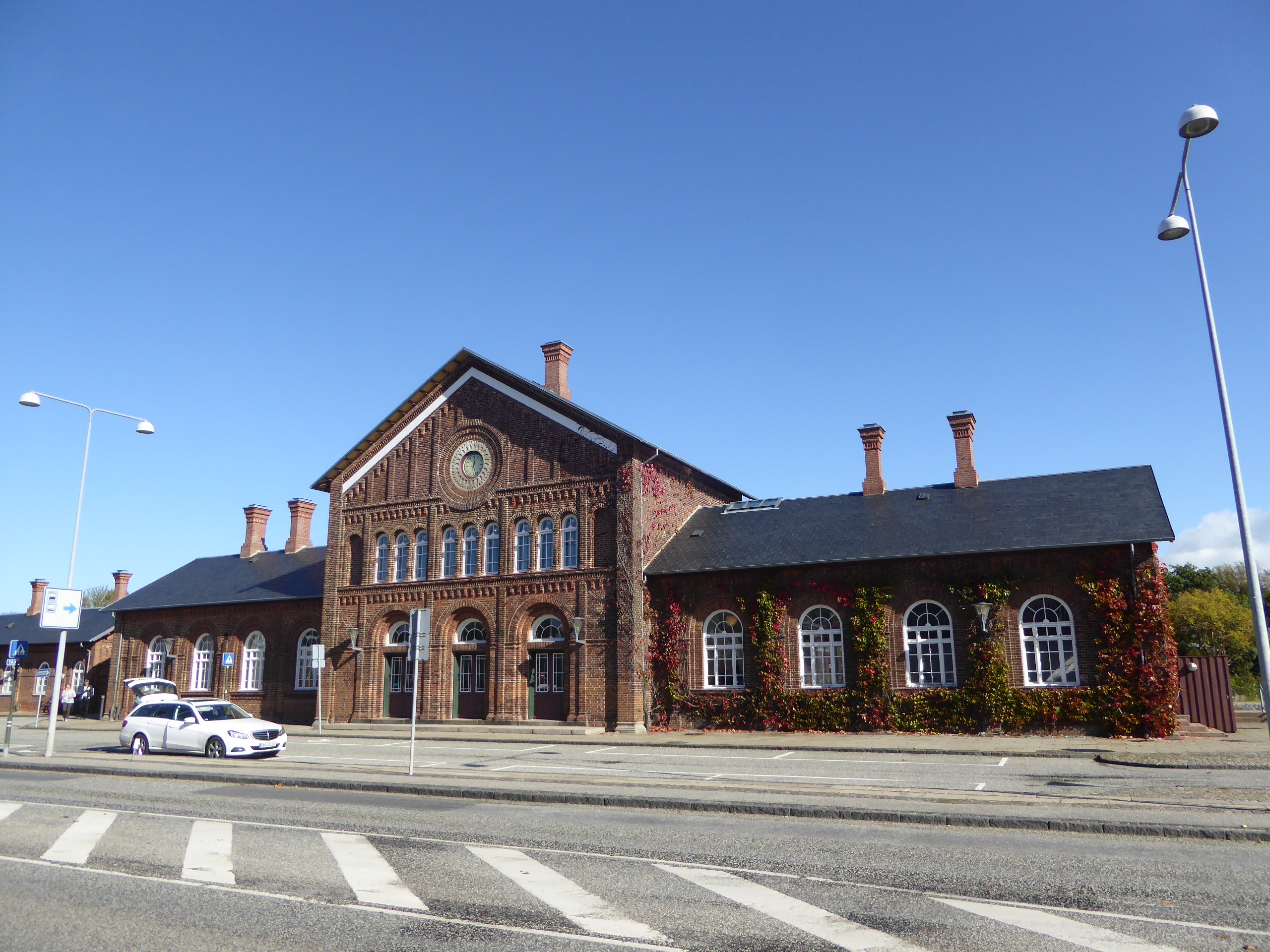
Ringkøbing railway station

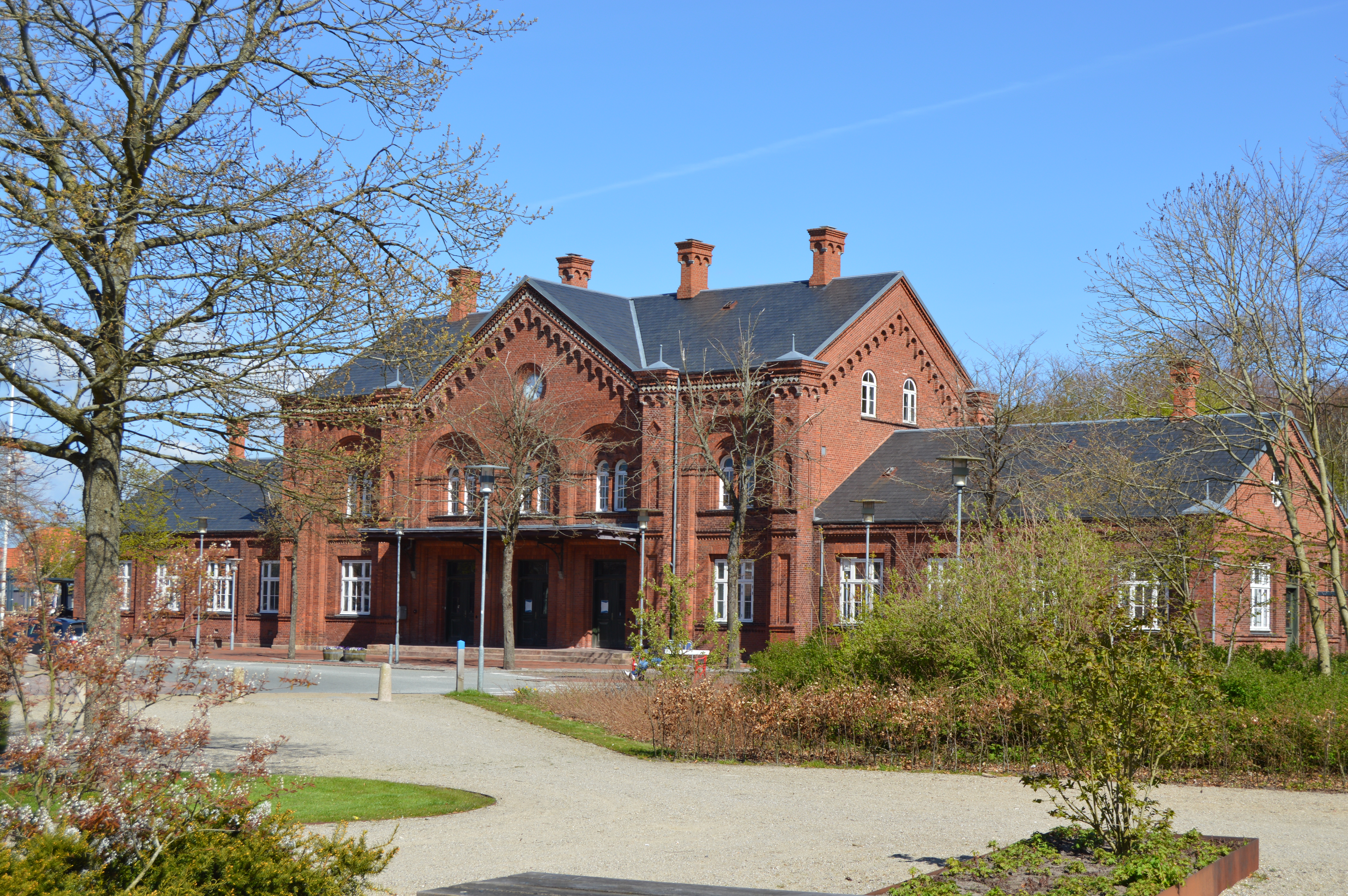
Ribe railway station

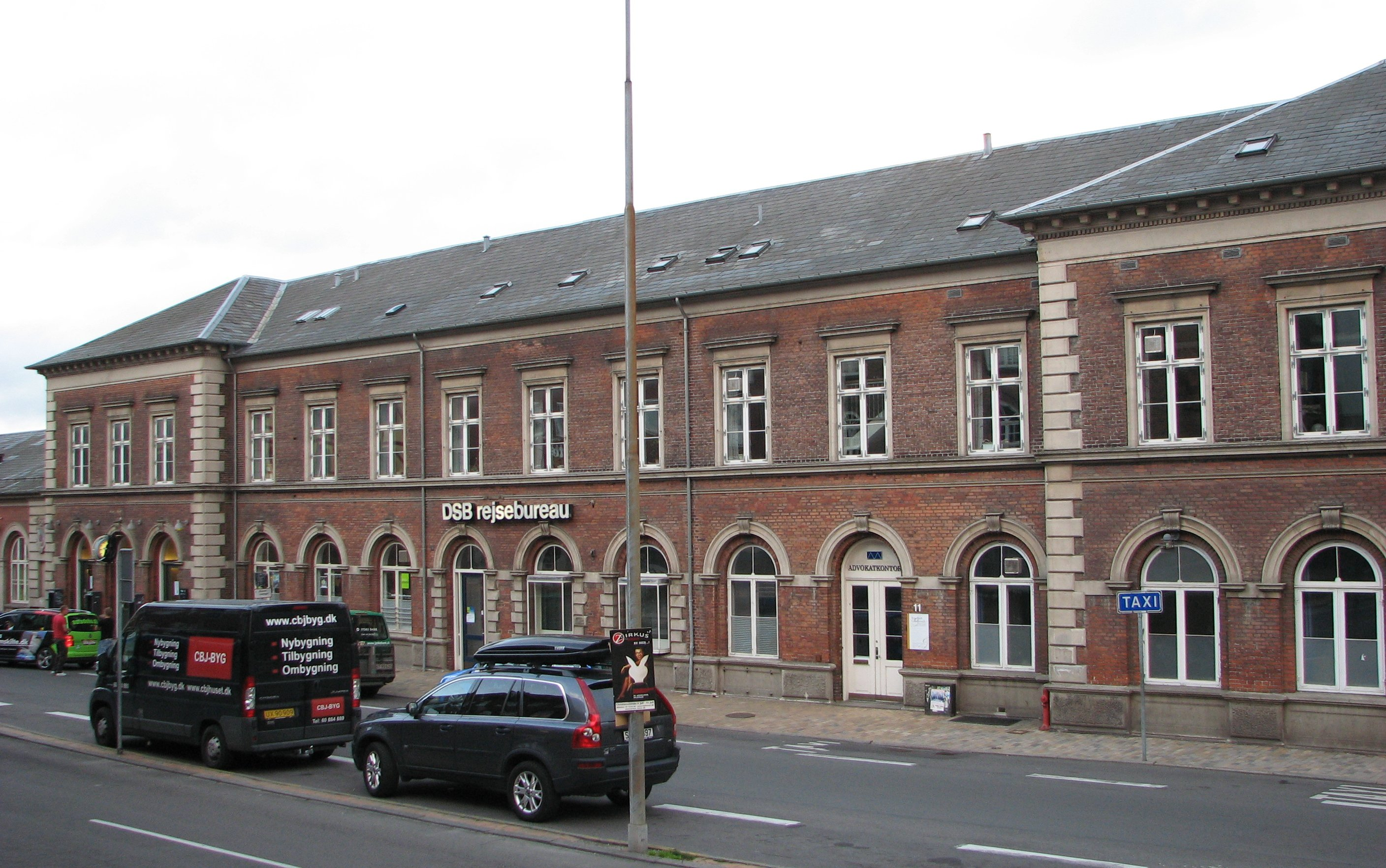
Svendborg railway station

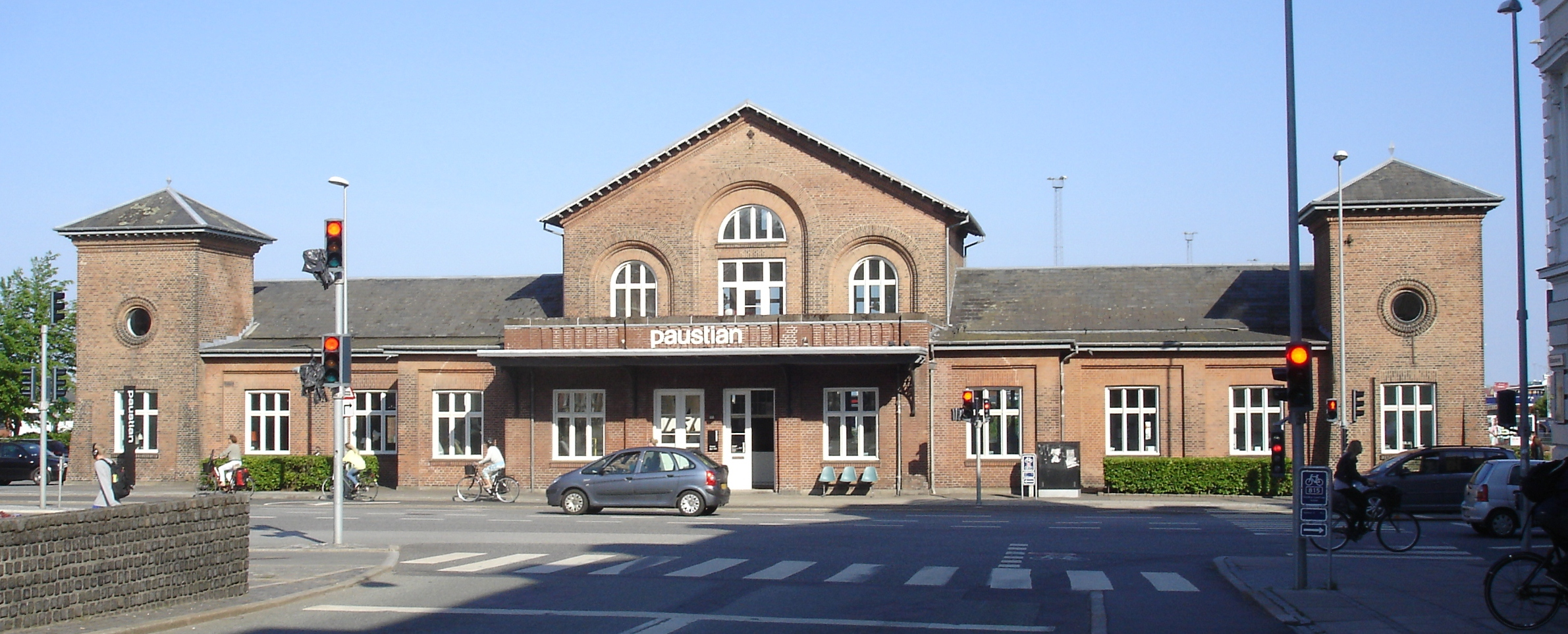
Aarhus East railway station

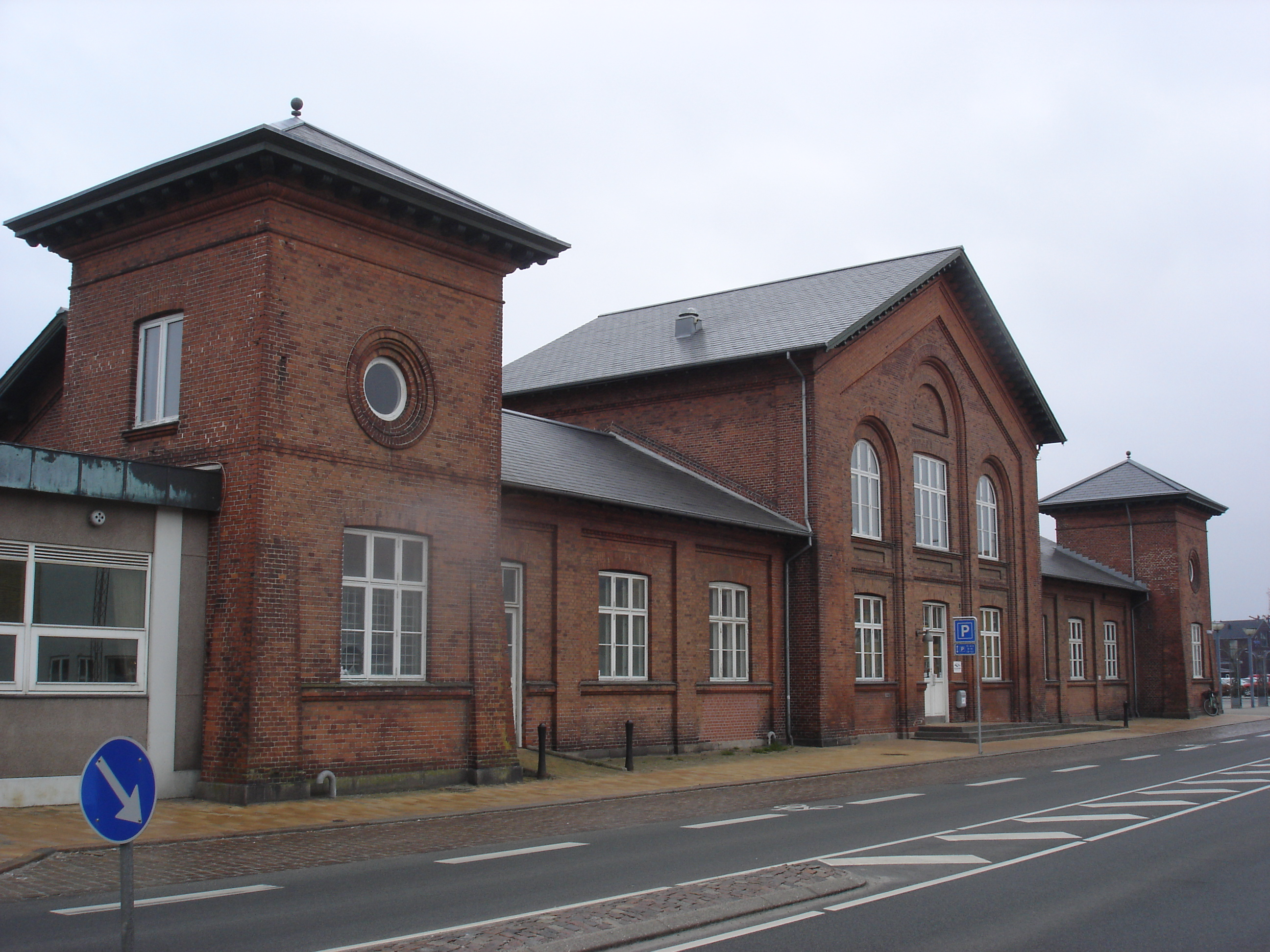
Faaborg railway station

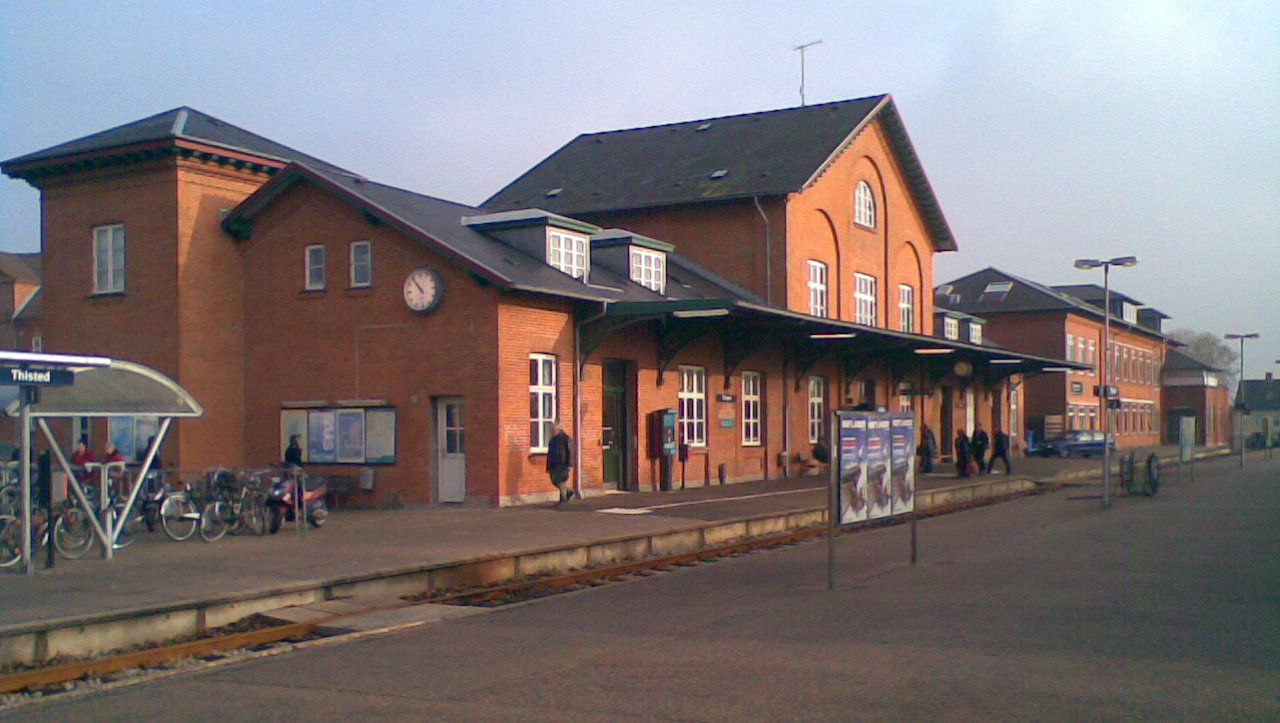
Thisted railway station

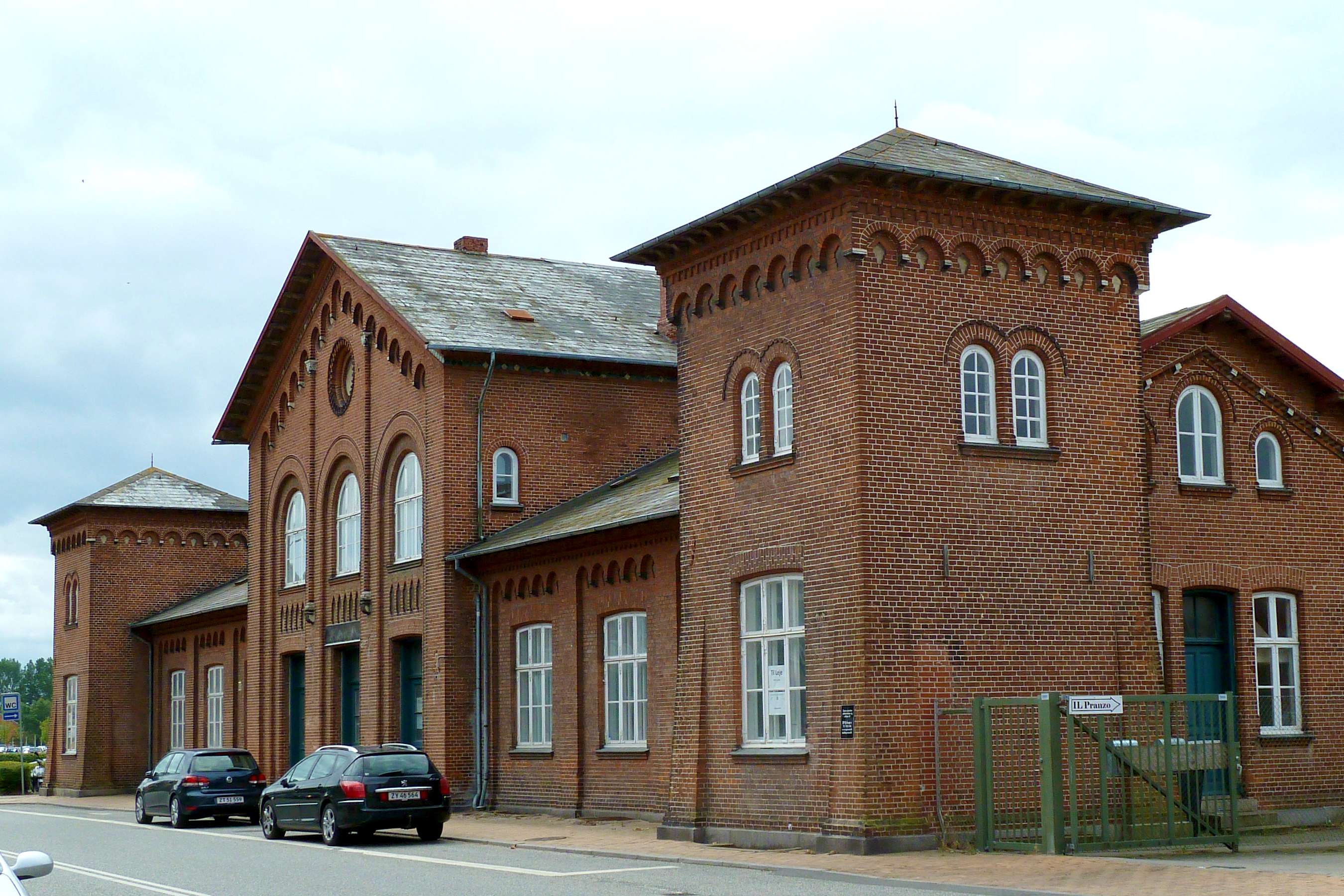
Assens railway station

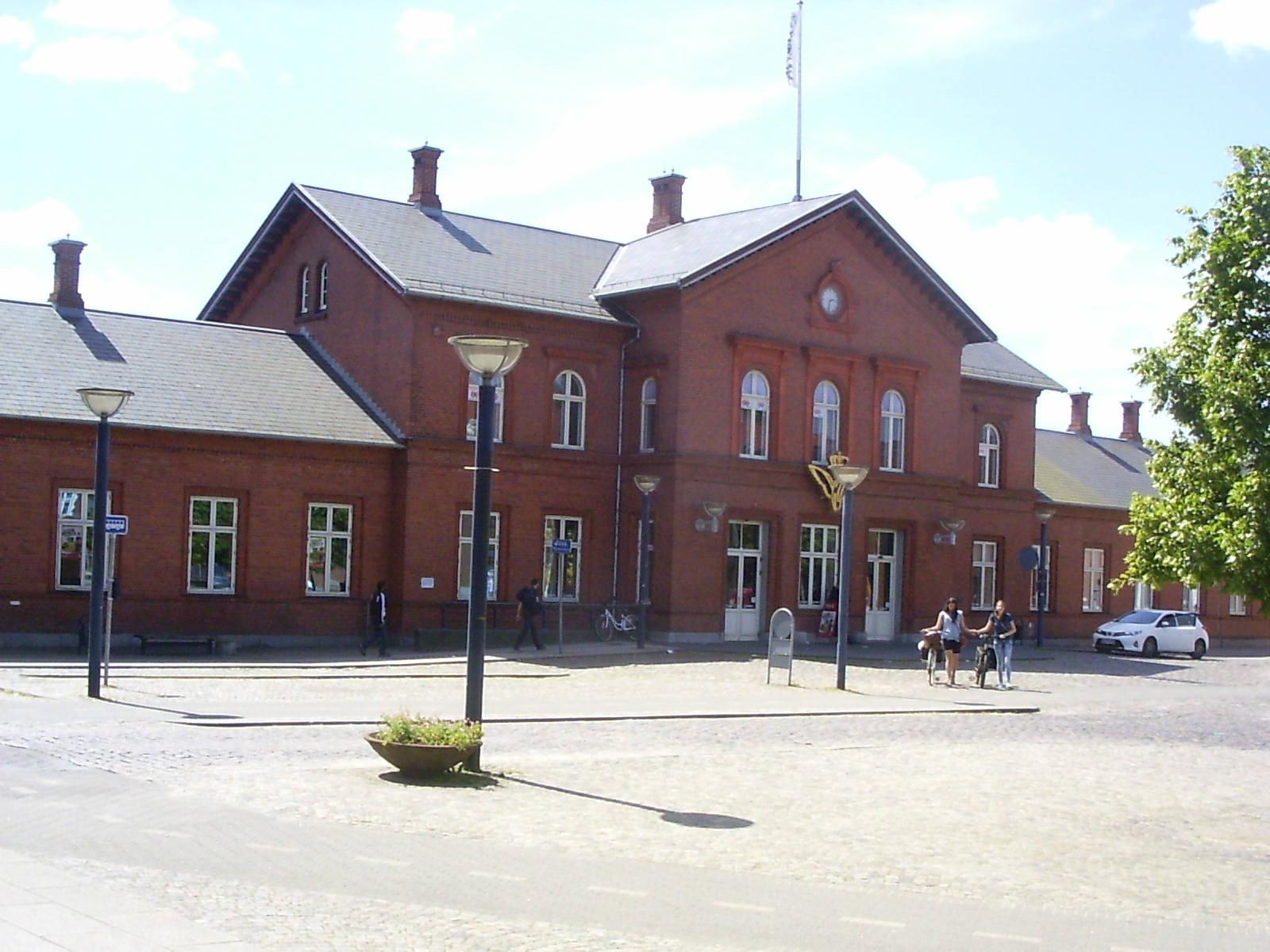
Viborg railway station

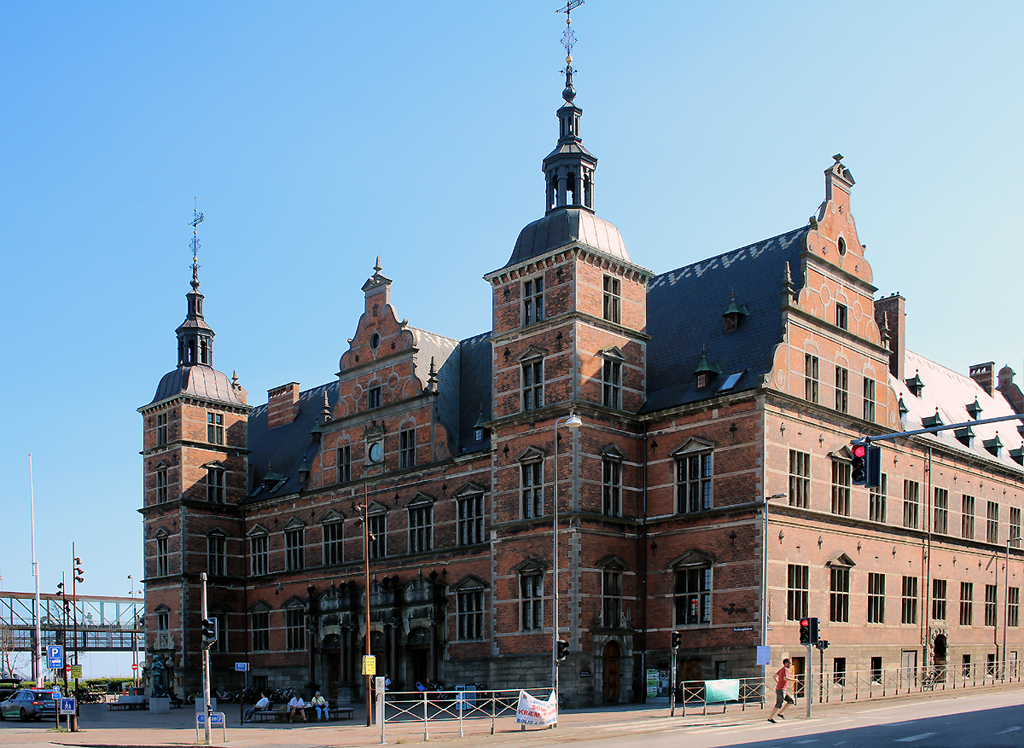
Helsingør railway station

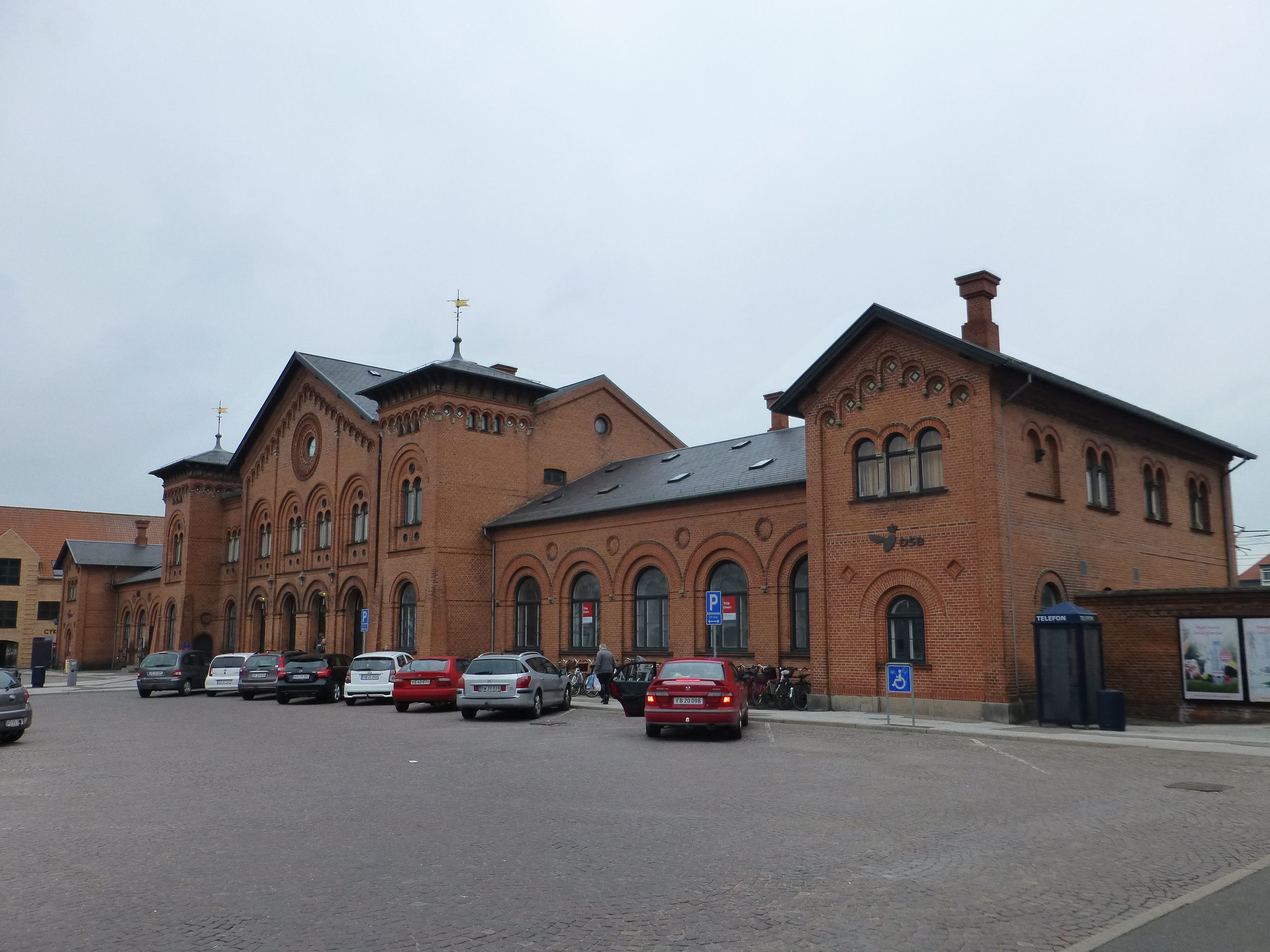
Slagelse railway station

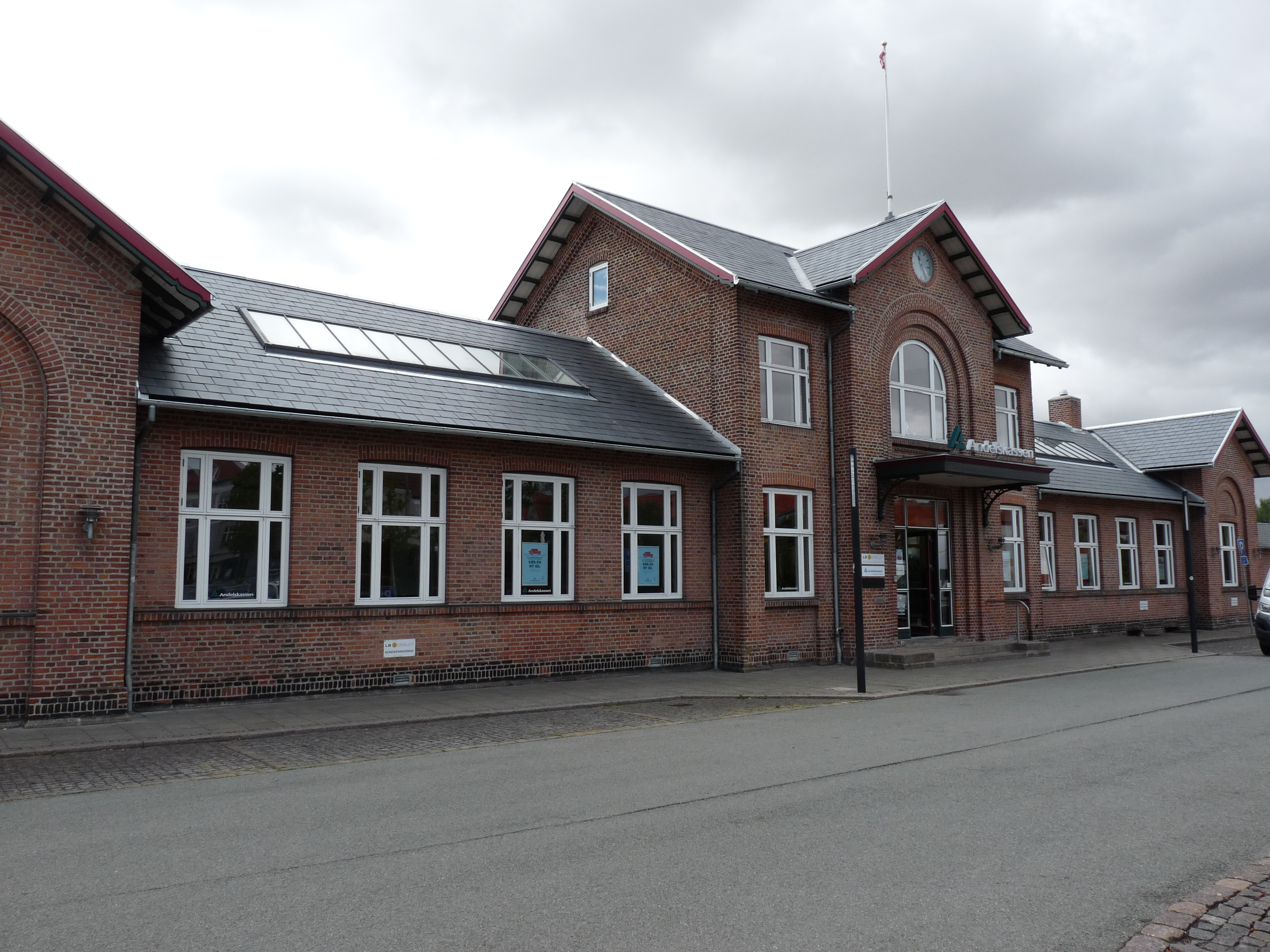
Grenaa railway station

== See also ==
- List of Danish architects
