= List of hills and mountains in Denmark =

This is a list of hills and mountains in Denmark.

== Hills in Denmark ==
This table lists only hills in the country of Denmark, excluding Danish territories (Faroe Islands and Greenland). The listing only considers natural formations.

No. !	Mountain	Country part	Elevation		Notes
No. !	Mountain	Country part	m	ft	Notes
1	Møllehøj	Skanderborg municipality	170.86	560.6	
2	Yding Skovhøj	Horsens municipality	170.77	560.3	One of the Bronze Age burial mounds on top reaches 172.54 m (566.1 ft)
3	Ejer Bavnehøj	Skanderborg municipality	170.35	558.9	
4	Lindbjerg		170.08	558.0	
5	Margretelyst SØ		169.78	557.0	
6	Vistofte		169.44	555.9	
7	Rytterknægten	Bornholm	162	531	Highest point of the island
8	Himmelbjerget	Skanderborg municipality	147	482	Considered the highest peak in Denmark until 1847
9	Aborrebjerg	Møn	143	469	Highest point of the island

== Mountains in Danish territories ==
- Gunnbjørn, Greenland, 3,700 m (12,100 ft). Highest mountain in the Kingdom of Denmark.
