= 2025 Skanderborg municipal election =

Municipal election in Denmark

← 2021	18 November 2025	2029 →

All 29 seats to the Skanderborg municipal council 15 seats needed for a majority
- Turnout: 38,105 (77.0%) ▲2.7%
	First party	Second party	Third party
	A	V	F
Party	Social Democrats	Venstre	Green Left
Last election	10 seats, 30.0%	7 seats, 24.1%	2 seats, 8.6%
Seats won	9	5	4
Seat change	▼1	▼2	▲2
Popular vote	10,881	6,131	4,483
Percentage	29.0%	16.3%	11.9%
Swing	▼1.1%	▼7.7%	▲3.3%
	Fourth party	Fifth party	Sixth party
	B	C	I
Party	Social Liberals	Conservatives	Liberal Alliance
Last election	2 seats, 7.5%	4 seats, 12.7%	0 seats, 2.0%
Seats won	3	3	2
Seat change	▲1	▼1	▲2
Popular vote	4,137	4,099	2,423
Percentage	11.0%	10.9%	6.5%
Swing	▲3.5%	▼1.8%	▲4.4%
	Seventh party	Eighth party	Ninth party
	Æ	Ø	O
Party	Denmark Democrats	Red-Green Alliance	Danish People's Party
Last election	Did not stand	1 seat, 4.3%	1 seat, 4.3%
Seats won	1	1	1
Seat change	▲1	0	0
Popular vote	1,880	1,476	1,326
Percentage	5.0%	3.9%	3.5%
Swing	New	▼0.4%	▼0.8%
Mayor before election
Frands Fischer
Social Democrats
Mayor after election
Frands Fischer
Social Democrats

The 2025 Skanderborg Municipal election will be held on November 18, 2025, to elect the 29 members to sit in the regional council for the Skanderborg Municipal council, in the period of 2026 to 2029. Frands Fischer from the Social Democrats, would secure re-election.

== Background ==
Following the 2021 election, Frands Fischer from Social Democrats became mayor for his first full term. He would run for a second full term.

== Electoral system ==
For elections to Danish municipalities, a number varying from 9 to 31 are chosen to be elected to the municipal council. The seats are then allocated using the D'Hondt method and a closed list proportional representation. Skanderborg Municipality had 29 seats in 2025.

== Electoral alliances ==
=== Electoral Alliance 1 ===
Party		Political alignment
A	Social Democrats	Centre-left
B	Social Liberals	Centre to Centre-left
F	Green Left	Centre-left to Left-wing
M	Moderates	Centre to Centre-right
Ø	Red-Green Alliance	Left-wing to Far-Left
Å	The Alternative	Centre-left to Left-wing

=== Electoral Alliance 2 ===
Party		Political alignment
C	Conservatives	Centre-right
I	Liberal Alliance	Centre-right to Right-wing
O	Danish People's Party	Right-wing to Far-right
V	Venstre	Centre-right
Æ	Denmark Democrats	Right-wing to Far-right

== Results by polling station ==
Division	A	B	C	F	I	M	O	V	Æ	Ø	Å
Division	%	%	%	%	%	%	%	%	%	%	%
Ejer Bavnehøj	31.0	4.7	8.9	11.6	8.3	1.8	5.1	17.3	6.7	3.9	0.8
Galten	23.3	18.2	14.3	7.8	5.9	0.7	4.2	17.6	5.1	2.5	0.4
Gl. Rye	36.5	7.1	3.9	22.8	2.5	0.9	1.4	13.0	1.5	9.6	0.9
Hørning	35.3	4.9	18.7	9.0	6.4	2.4	4.4	10.9	4.3	3.2	0.4
Låsby	17.1	4.4	5.0	12.1	5.2	1.4	5.4	36.2	7.6	5.2	0.3
Morten Børup	29.7	11.5	9.8	11.8	8.4	0.9	3.4	15.6	3.8	4.5	0.8
Niels Ebbesen	25.4	18.9	12.3	10.1	8.5	2.0	2.9	13.3	3.0	3.2	0.4
Ry	32.6	8.0	8.7	20.4	3.9	0.9	1.8	15.7	2.0	5.1	0.7
Skovby	25.6	16.2	11.4	10.3	6.5	1.2	4.6	14.4	6.6	3.1	0.3
Stilling	42.4	7.0	9.7	8.6	7.8	1.3	3.2	11.7	5.3	2.5	0.4
Stjær	15.2	22.5	6.1	10.6	3.5	1.1	3.1	11.2	21.5	4.4	0.8
Virring	16.6	5.2	5.5	10.8	7.3	2.1	4.0	38.2	7.0	3.3	0.3

== Results ==
Party		Votes	%	+/-	Seats	+/-
Skanderborg Municipality
A	Social Democrats	10,881	28.98	-1.06	9	-1
V	Venstre	6,131	16.33	-7.73	5	-2
F	Green Left	4,483	11.94	+3.30	4	+2
B	Social Liberals	4,137	11.02	+3.47	3	+1
C	Conservatives	4,099	10.92	-1.82	3	-1
I	Liberal Alliance	2,423	6.45	+4.42	2	+2
Æ	Denmark Democrats	1,880	5.01	New	1	New
Ø	Red-Green Alliance	1,476	3.93	-0.39	1	0
O	Danish People's Party	1,326	3.53	-0.81	1	0
M	Moderates	515	1.37	New	0	New
Å	The Alternative	200	0.53	-1.78	0	-1
Total		37,551	100	N/A	29	N/A
Invalid votes		96	0.19	-0.03		
Blank votes		458	0.93	+0.15		
Turnout		38,105	77.04	+2.69		
Source: valg.dk

== Opinion polls ==
Polling firm	Fieldwork date	Sample size	A	V	C	F	B	O	Ø	Å	I	M	Æ	Lead
Epinion	4 Sep - 13 Oct 2025	522	27.8	16.6	4.9	12.8	8.0	5.1	4.9	1.5	8.5	3.0	6.9	11.2
2024 european parliament election	9 Jun 2024		15.8	15.1	9.2	18.8	8.3	4.7	4.6	2.4	7.7	6.9	6.4	3.0
2022 general election	1 Nov 2022		26.8	14.4	4.9	9.3	4.4	1.8	3.9	3.5	9.8	9.9	7.0	12.4
2021 regional election	16 Nov 2021		30.3	22.1	12.7	7.9	6.0	3.8	6.2	1.2	2.0	–	–	8.2
2021 municipal election	16 Nov 2021		30.0 (10)	24.1 (7)	12.7 (4)	8.6 (2)	7.5 (2)	4.3 (1)	4.3 (1)	2.3 (1)	2.0 (0)	–	–	5.9
