= 2021 Skanderborg municipal election =

← 2017	16 November 2021	2025 →

All 29 seats to the Skanderborg Municipal Council 15 seats needed for a majority
- Turnout: 35,504 (74.3%) ▼3.5pp
	First party	Second party	Third party
	A	V	C
Party	Social Democrats	Venstre	Conservatives
Last election	11 seats, 36.8%	8 seats, 24.4%	1 seat, 5.2%
Seats won	10	7	4
Seat change	▼1	▼1	▲3
Popular vote	10,512	8,418	4,458
Percentage	30.0%	24.0%	12.7%
Swing	▼6.8%	▼0.4%	▲7.5%
	Fourth party	Fifth party	Sixth party
	F	B	O
Party	Green Left	Social Liberals	Danish People's Party
Last election	2 seats, 6.8%	2 seats, 6.6%	3 seats, 8.8%
Seats won	2	2	1
Seat change	0	0	▼2
Popular vote	3,024	2,642	1,520
Percentage	8.6%	7.6%	4.3%
Swing	▲1.8%	▲1.0%	▼4.5%
	Seventh party	Eighth party	Ninth party
	Ø	D	Å
Party	Red–Green Alliance	New Right	The Alternative
Last election	1 seat, 4.2%	0 seats, 0.8%	1 seat, 3.4%
Seats won	1	1	1
Seat change	0	▲1	0
Popular vote	1,511	1,299	808
Percentage	4.3%	3.7%	2.3%
Swing	▲0.1%	▲2.9%	▼1.1%
Mayor before election
Jørgen Gaarde
Social Democrats
Mayor after election
Frands Fischer
Social Democrats

Since the first election following the 2007 municipal reform, Jørgen Gaarde from the Social Democrats had been mayor of Skanderborg Municipality. This was until 2019 when he announced he was resigning and that Frands Fischer would take over.

In this election, the Social Democrats suffered the highest decrease in total vote share, and lost a seat. However the traditional red bloc won 16 seats, and eventually it was announced that Frands Fischer would continue as mayor.

== Electoral system ==
For elections to Danish municipalities, a number varying from 9 to 31 are chosen to be elected to the municipal council. The seats are then allocated using the D'Hondt method and a closed list proportional representation. Skanderborg Municipality had 29 seats in 2021

Unlike in Danish General Elections, in elections to municipal councils, electoral alliances are allowed.

== Electoral alliances ==
=== Electoral Alliance 1 ===
Party		Political alignment
H	Hanne Stender Damkjær	Local politics
Ø	Red–Green Alliance	Left-wing to Far-Left
Å	The Alternative	Centre-left to Left-wing

=== Electoral Alliance 2 ===
Party		Political alignment
C	Conservatives	Centre-right
I	Liberal Alliance	Centre-right to Right-wing

=== Electoral Alliance 3 ===
Party		Political alignment
A	Social Democrats	Centre-left
B	Social Liberals	Centre to Centre-left
F	Green Left	Centre-left to Left-wing

=== Electoral Alliance 4 ===
Party		Political alignment
D	New Right	Right-wing to Far-right
O	Danish People's Party	Right-wing to Far-right
V	Venstre	Centre-right

== Results by polling station ==
H = Hanne Stender Damkjær

Division	A	B	C	D	F	H	I	O	V	Ø	Å
Division	%	%	%	%	%	%	%	%	%	%	%
Ejer Bavnehøj	17.9	3.1	9.2	4.2	8.1	0.1	1.3	3.9	44.8	5.2	2.2
Galten	33.4	10.4	12.9	3.6	4.9	0.1	4.5	3.7	22.9	2.5	1.1
Gl. Rye	35.8	5.1	8.0	2.3	19.2	0.6	1.8	1.3	14.4	6.8	4.7
Hørning	32.2	3.6	21.2	4.5	7.2	0.6	1.4	4.3	20.1	3.7	1.2
Ry	27.4	6.7	11.8	2.6	14.3	0.3	1.2	1.7	23.6	6.2	4.2
Niels Ebbesen	28.0	13.5	13.8	2.9	6.5	0.3	2.2	3.1	23.5	3.8	2.5
Låsby	16.2	3.7	10.8	4.3	7.9	0.1	1.4	7.7	41.6	4.7	1.5
Morten Børup	32.6	8.7	11.0	3.2	9.1	0.4	1.8	4.1	20.8	5.4	2.8
Skovby	35.6	6.1	12.4	4.5	8.4	0.1	2.9	4.7	20.9	2.7	1.5
Stilling	41.4	5.2	10.8	3.5	6.0	0.0	1.8	3.7	22.8	2.6	2.1
Stjær	16.9	19.0	7.8	2.8	7.7	0.0	1.2	19.7	17.4	5.7	1.7
Virring	22.6	3.8	8.8	9.5	6.9	0.1	2.6	4.2	35.8	3.7	2.0

== Results ==
Party		Votes	%	+/-	Seats	+/-
Skanderborg Municipality
A	Social Democrats	10,512	30.04	-6.79	10	-1
V	Venstre	8,418	24.05	-0.38	7	-1
C	Conservatives	4,458	12.74	+7.55	4	+3
F	Green Left	3,024	8.64	+1.89	2	0
B	Social Liberals	2,642	7.55	+0.93	2	0
O	Danish People's Party	1,520	4.34	-4.49	1	-2
Ø	Red-Green Alliance	1,511	4.32	+0.16	1	0
D	New Right	1,299	3.71	+2.93	1	+1
Å	The Alternative	808	2.31	-1.14	1	0
I	Liberal Alliance	713	2.04	-0.89	0	0
H	Hanne Stender Damkjær	92	0.26	New	0	New
Total		34,997	100	N/A	29	N/A
Invalid votes		107	0.22	+0.14		
Blank votes		400	0.84	+0.08		
Turnout		35,504	74.34	-3.45		
Source: valg.dk
