= Voerladegård =

- Village
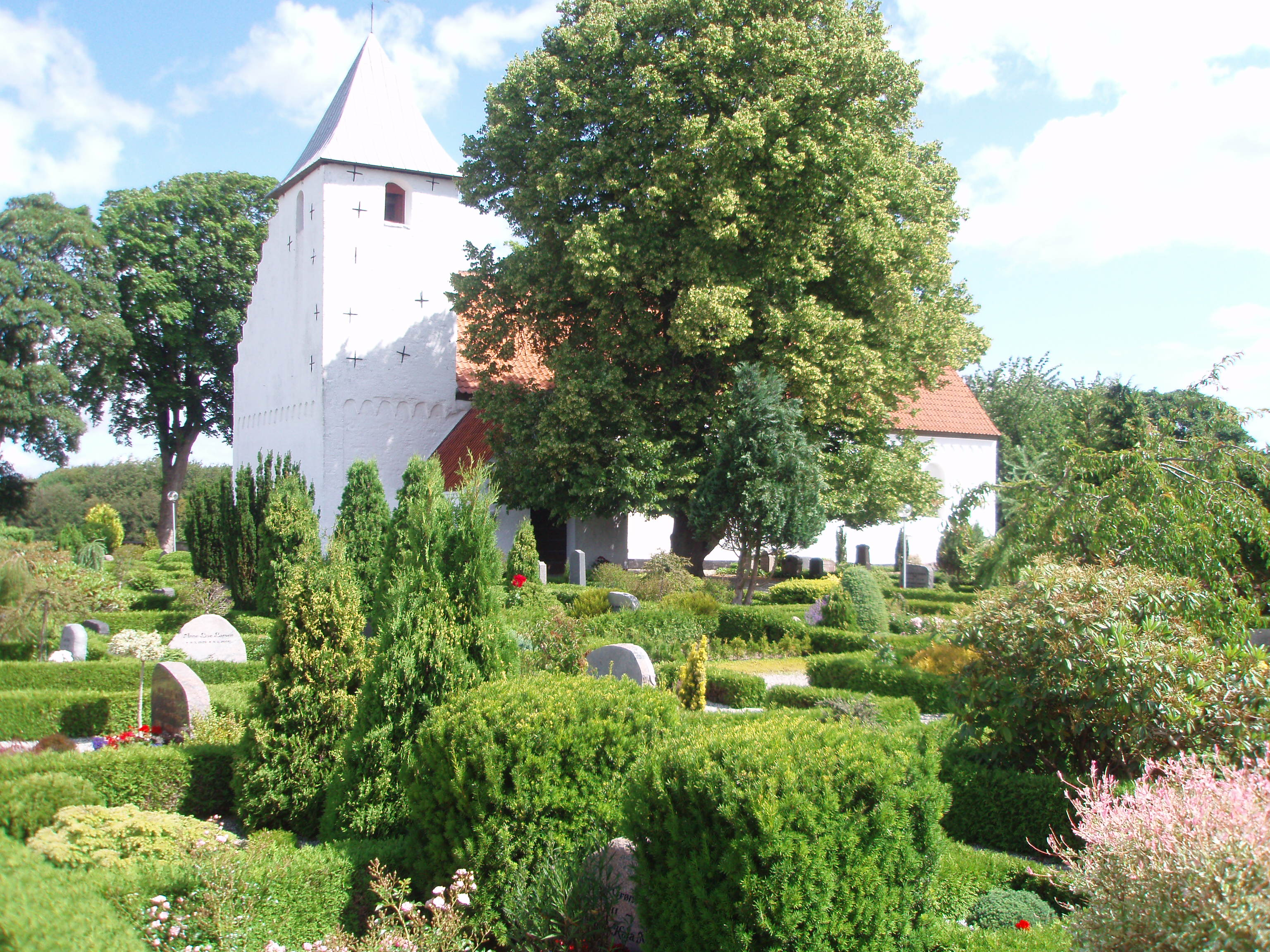
- Voerladegård Church

- Location in Central Denmark Region Voerladegård (Denmark)
- Coordinates: 56°1′28″N 9°43′58″E
- Country: Denmark
- Region: Central Denmark (Midtjylland)
- Municipality: Skanderborg
- Parish: Voerladegård Parish

Population (2026)
  - Total: 594

Voerladegård is a village, with a population of 594 (1 January 2026), in Skanderborg Municipality, Central Denmark Region in Denmark. It is situated just south of the Mossø lake, part of the larger Søhøjlandet region.

Voerladegård Church is located in the village.
