= Aborrebjerg =

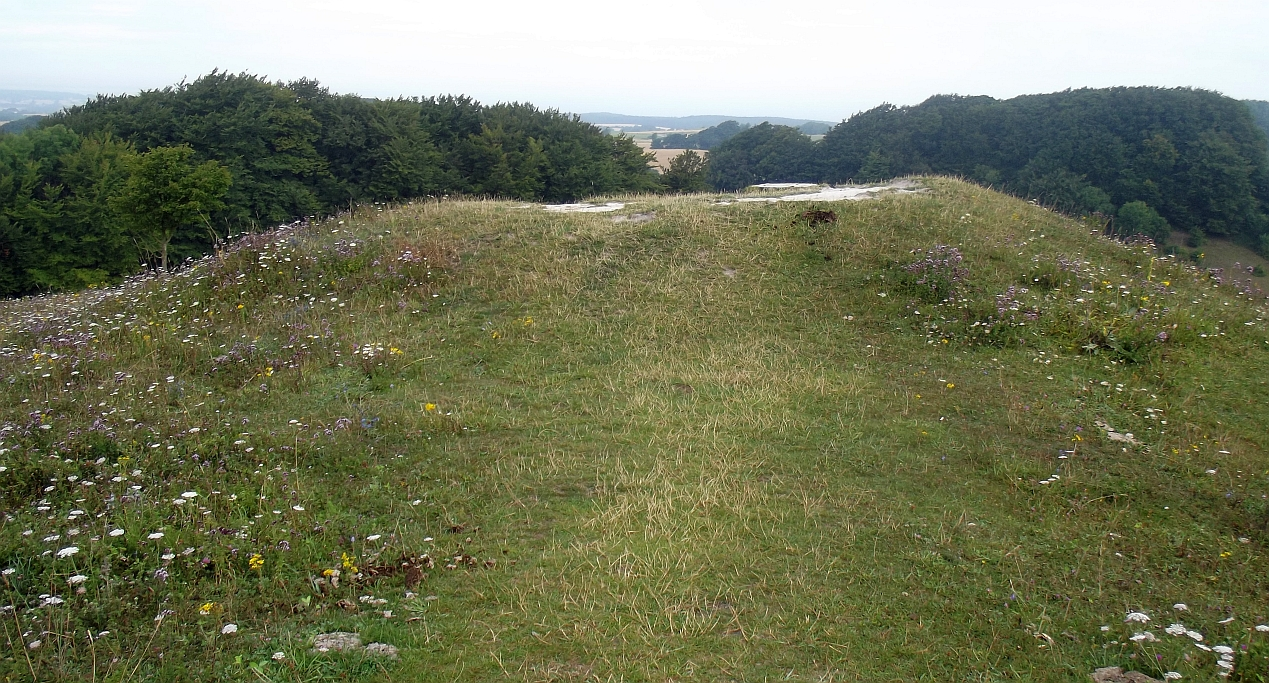
- Aborrebjerg summit

Highest point
- Elevation: 143 m (469 ft)
- Prominence: 143 m (469 ft)
- Coordinates: 54°58′53″N 12°31′47″E

Geography
- Location within Denmark
- Location: Møn, Denmark

Geology
- Mountain type: Sedimentary rocks (chalk)

Climbing
- Easiest route: Hike

Aborrebjerg is a hill on the Danish island of Møn.

== Geography ==
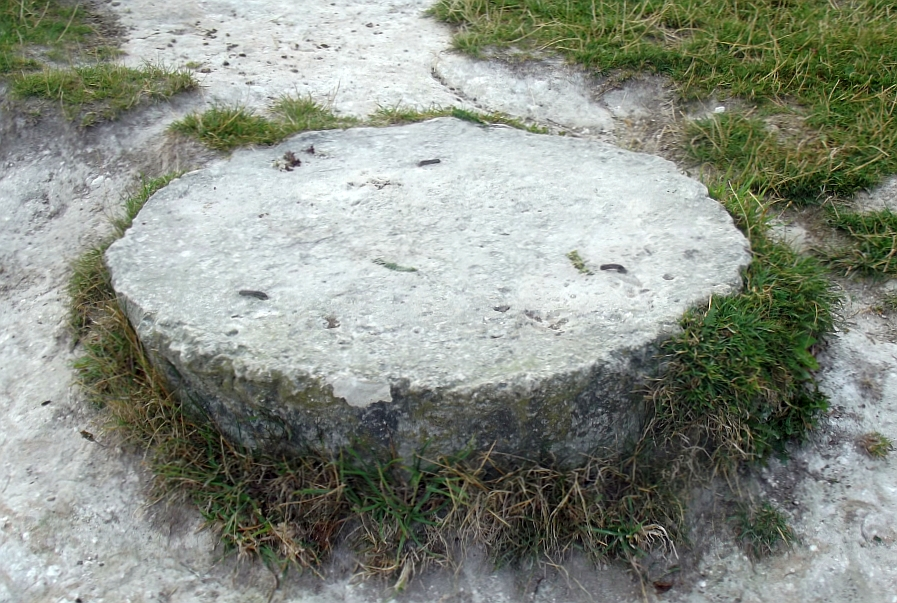
Summit stone

The hill stands at 143 m (469 ft) and is the highest point in Møn island and the eighth in Denmark, very close to Møns Klint.

Aborrebjerg is mainly covered by wood and shrubs like junipers; behind it some ponds are located. The summit is marked with a circular stone.

== Geology ==
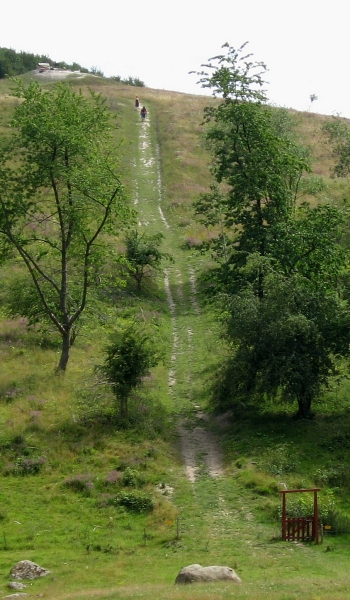
North track to the summit

As well as the neighbouring cliffs Aborrebjerg bedrock is chalk, which originated during the Cretaceous and was later lifted to its present location by tectonic movements following the ice ages.

== Access to the summit ==
The can be easily reached through a waymarked footpath. From the summit there is a good view. With good weather looking west both Farøbroerne and Queen Alexandrine Bridge can be seen, while looking north one can see up to Stevns.

== See also ==
- Møllehøj
- List of hills and mountains in Denmark
