= Ejer =

Village in Denmark

Coordinates: 55°59′N 9°49′E

Ejer is a village located near Ejer Bavnehøj in the Skanderborg Municipality of Denmark. The placename, of uncertain etymology, was first recorded in 1437 as Eyer, and in 1492 as Eyerd.
