= Silkeborg Forests =

Forest in Denmark

Silkeborg Forests Silkeborgskovene
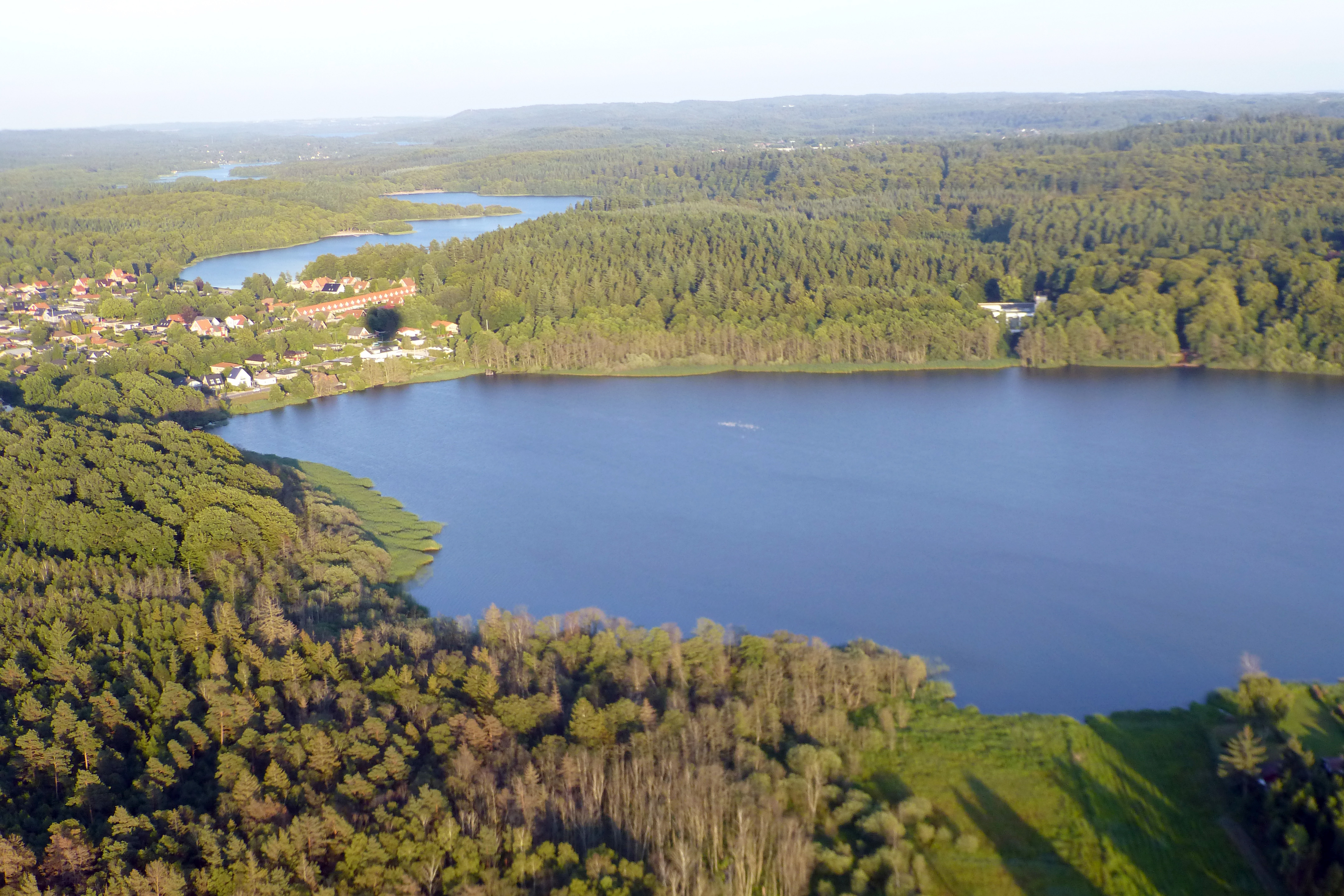
- Aerial view of Silkeborg Forests.

- Location within Denmark
- Interactive map of Silkeborg Forests

Geography
- Location: Silkeborg, Skanderborg, Denmark
- Coordinates: 56°08′N 09°35′E
- Area: 224 km^{2} (86 sq mi)

Ecology
- WWF Classification: Baltic mixed forests

Silkeborg Forests is Denmark’s largest forest. It comprises a collection of several independent private and public woodlands, that have been allowed to merge into a single connected forest south of the city of Silkeborg. At 22,400 ha, it is Denmark's largest forest since 2004, after Rold Skov, and it is located within the largest forest district in the country as well. The forests forms an important part of the larger regional landscape known as Søhøjlandet.

Silkeborg Forests are named after the city of Silkeborg, situated in the northern outskirts and the forest is naturally divided into a north, west, east and south section, known as Nordskoven, Vesterskoven, Østerskoven and Sønderskoven respectively.

== Protections ==
A total area of 1,455 ha of the forest is protected under Natura 2000 and is designated as area 57 and EU Habitat area H181.

The protection comprises several conservationally important forest and aquatic habitats. Amongst these, habitat type 9120 defined as "Beech forests (Fagus sylvatica) with holly (Ilex), growing on acidic soils, in a humid Atlantic climate", is the most prevalent forest habitat at 351 ha, while habitat type 3150, defined as "Natural eutrophic lakes with Magnopotamion or Hydrocharition-type vegetation" is the most prevalent aquatic habitat in the area, at 188 ha. There are other important - but less extent - habitat types present, like the 54 ha Lobelian lake of Almind Sø for example.

The designation is also based on the presence of European brook lamprey, Northern crested newt, Pond bat and the European otter living here.
