= Listed buildings in Skanderborg Municipality =

This is a list of listed buildings in Skanderborg Municipality, Denmark.

== The list ==
Listing name	Image	Location	Year built	Summary	source
Amtsgården		Adelgade 19, 8660 Skanderborg	1804		Ref
Dansepavillonen ved Vestermølle		Oddervej 80X, 8660 Skanderborg	1900		Ref
Frederik VI Memorial		Slotsholmen 0, 8660 Skanderborg	1705		Ref
Gæstgivergården Jylland		Oddervej 80X, 8660 Skanderborg	1700		Ref
Ringkloster		Ringklostervej 18, 8660 Skanderborg	1900		Ref
Ry station (2)		Klostervej 3, 8680 Ry	1910		Ref
Sjelle Rectory (3)		Præstegårdsvej 1, 8464 Galten	1900		Ref
Skanderborg Rectory		Adelgade 13, 8660 Skanderborg	1740		Ref
Skanderborg Town Hall (2)		Adelgade 38, 8660 Skanderborg	1910		Ref
Wedelslund		Wedelslundvej 2, 8464 Galten	1722		Ref
