= Sky mountain =

Sky mountain can refer to:

- Sky Mountain, near Sedona, Arizona, USA.
- Tian Shan in Central Asia
- Himmelbjerget in Denmark
