= Søhøjlandet =

Coordinates: 56.072°N 9.74°E

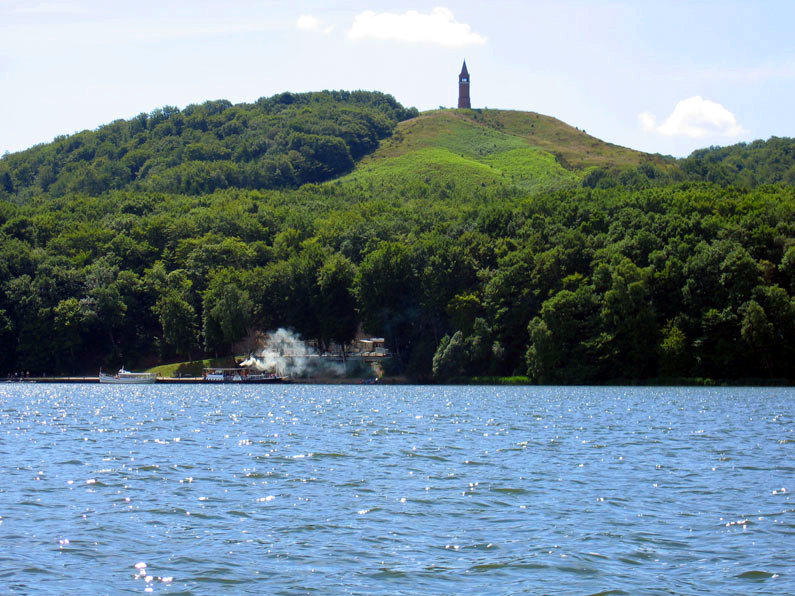
The hill of Himmelbjerget as seen from lake Julsø. Himmelbjerget, situated in Søhøjlandet, is one of the highest points in the country.

Søhøjlandet (English: The Lake-highland) is the highest lying region in Denmark and at the same time, it has the highest density of lakes.

== Administrative structure ==
Søhøjlandet lies within Central Denmark Region in eastern Jutland and comprise Silkeborg Municipality, Aarhus Municipality, Samsø Municipality, Odder Municipality, Skanderborg Municipality, the northern part of Horsens Municipality and smaller parts of Hedensted Municipality and Favrskov Municipality.

The area is administered by a special department under the Danish Nature Agency; Nature Agency - Søhøjlandet, who has responsibility for the management of nature, outdoor activities and public guidance in the area. In practice this implies tasks such as administering the forestry laws, advisory service to private woodlandowners on subsidies, advisory service about damage to or by wild animals and handling exemptions to game management within the area.

Nature Agency - Søhøjlandet has its headquarters in the southernmost part of Silkeborg known as Vejlbo, next to the research, business and educational facilities of Ferskvandscenteret (English: The Freshwater Centre), north of Vejlsø lake.

== Nature ==
The landscape of Søhøjlandet is characterized by extensive forests, lakes enclosed by woodlands, heathlands and many smaller meadows and pasture commons, covering hilly terrains. Several of the larger lakes are interconnected by the Gudenå, the longest river in Denmark. The river of Salten Å also marks the landscape. Several of the lakes in Søhøjlandet are of biological interest and the lake of Slåensø, is considered among the cleanest lakes in Denmark. Forests accounts for more than 30% of the total area of Søhøjlandet, primarily found in Silkeborg Forests.

A larger part of Søhøjlandet is to be protected and is designated as Natura 2000, EU Habitats Directive, Ramsar and various bird protection areas. The bird life is rich and varied and of international importance.

== Gallery ==
Typical landscapes of Søhøjlandet:

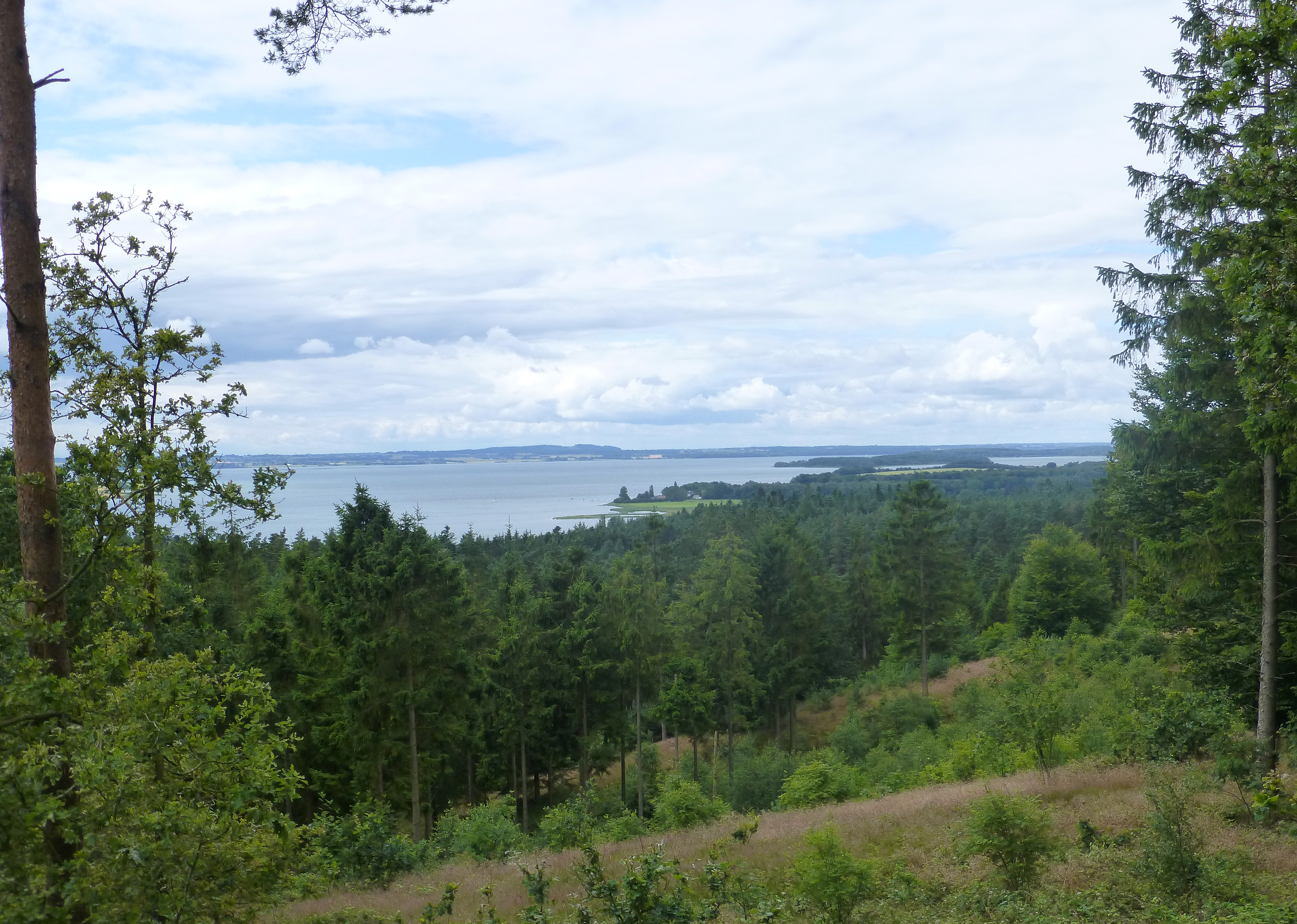

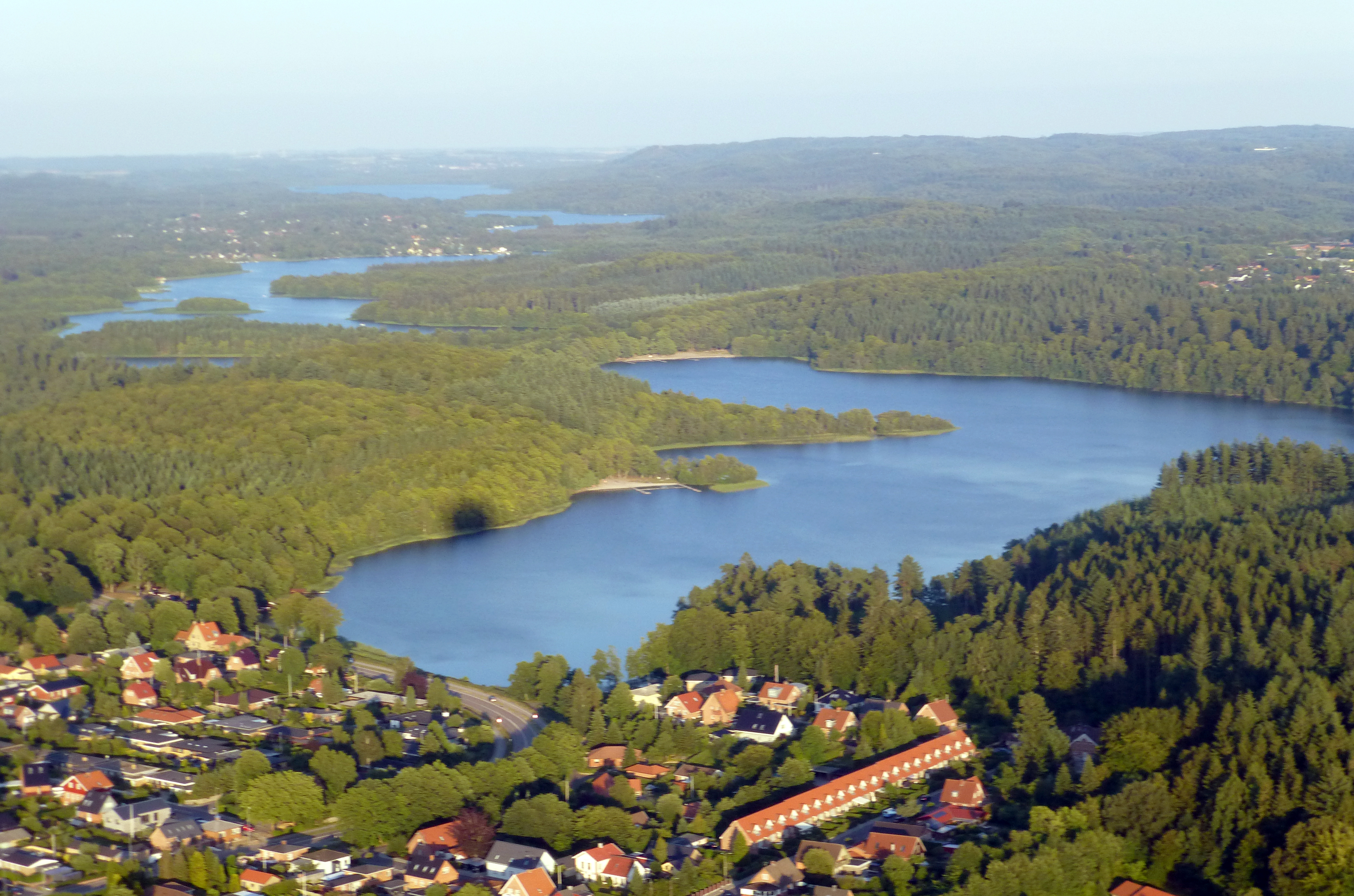

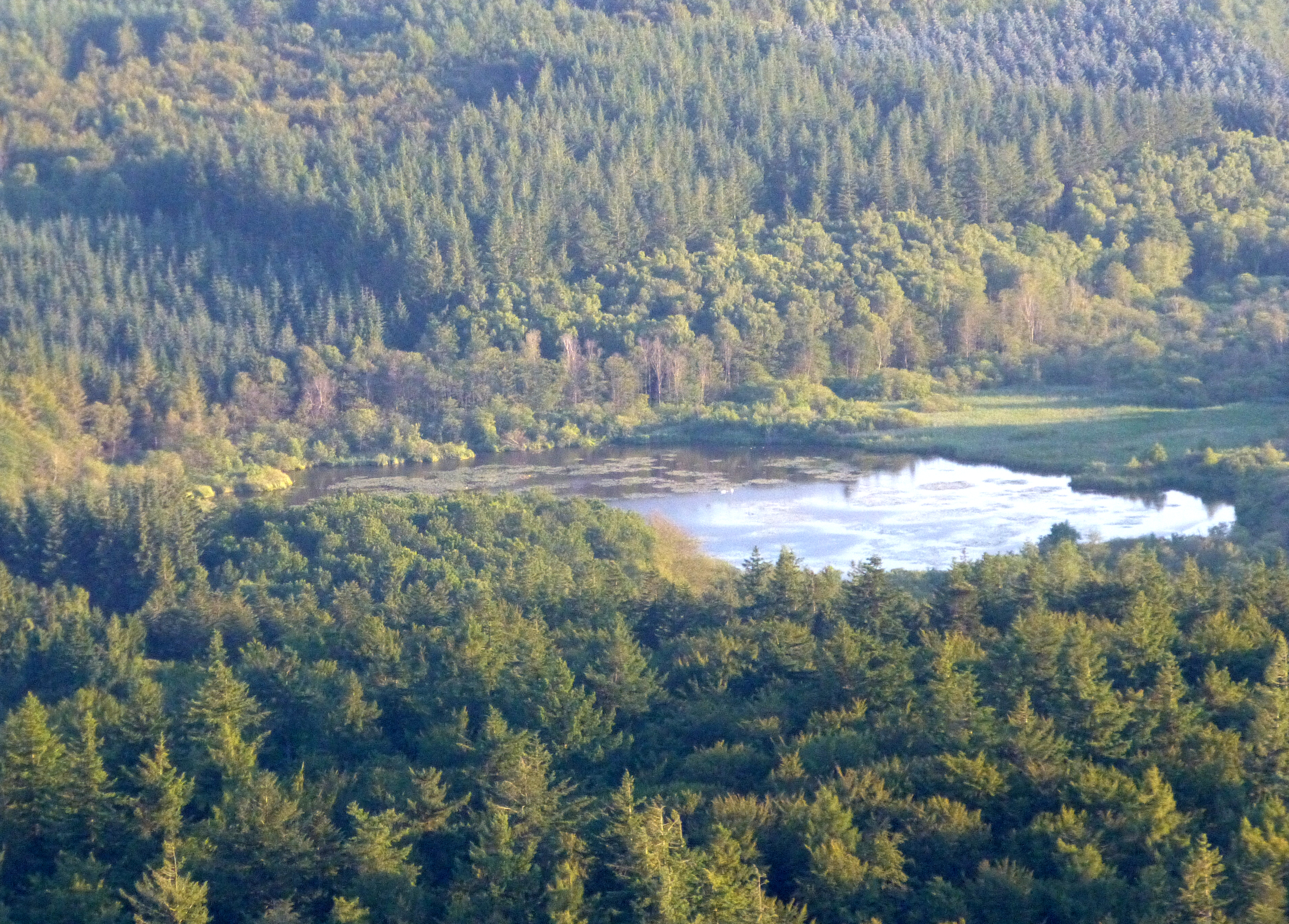

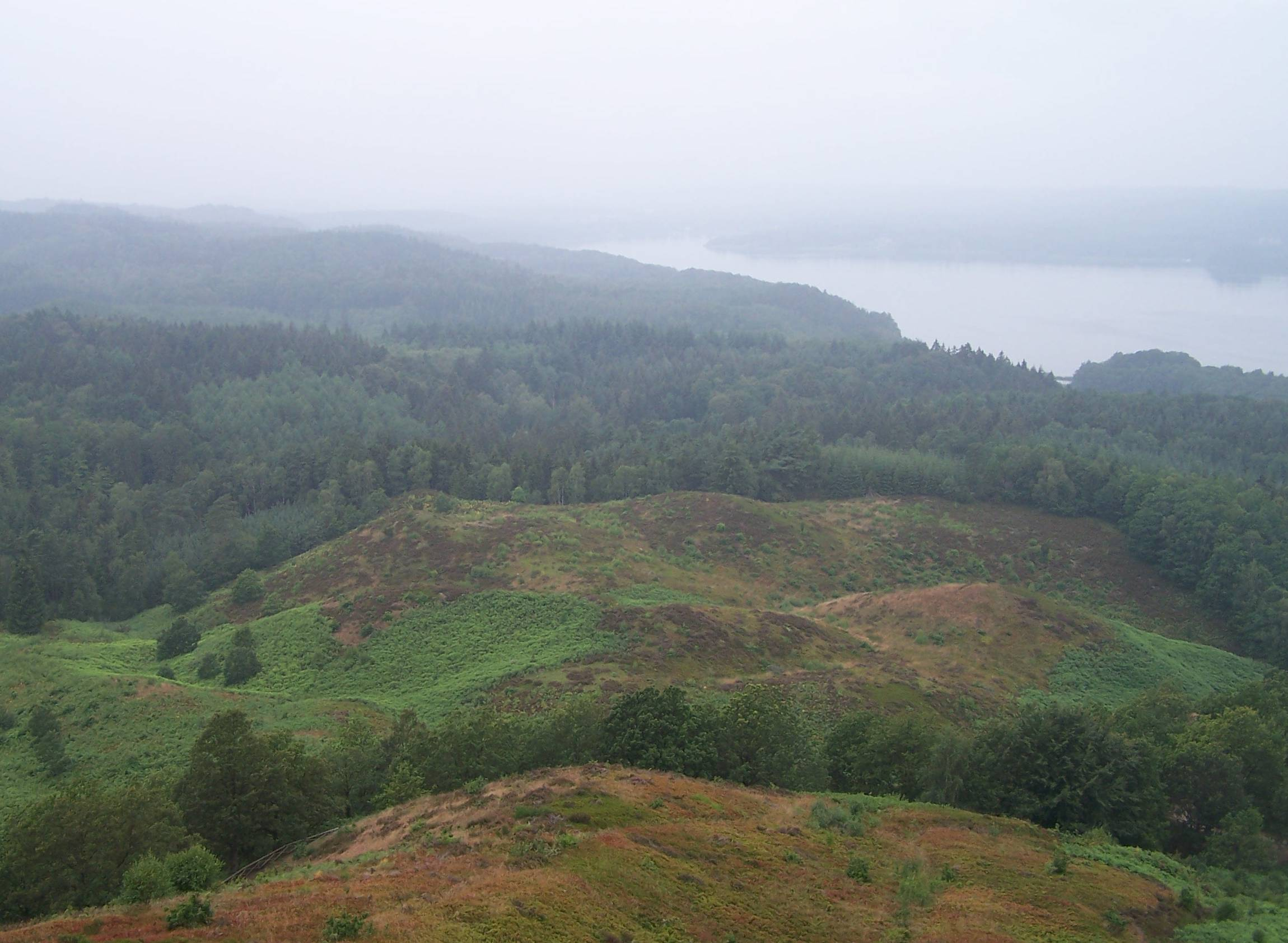

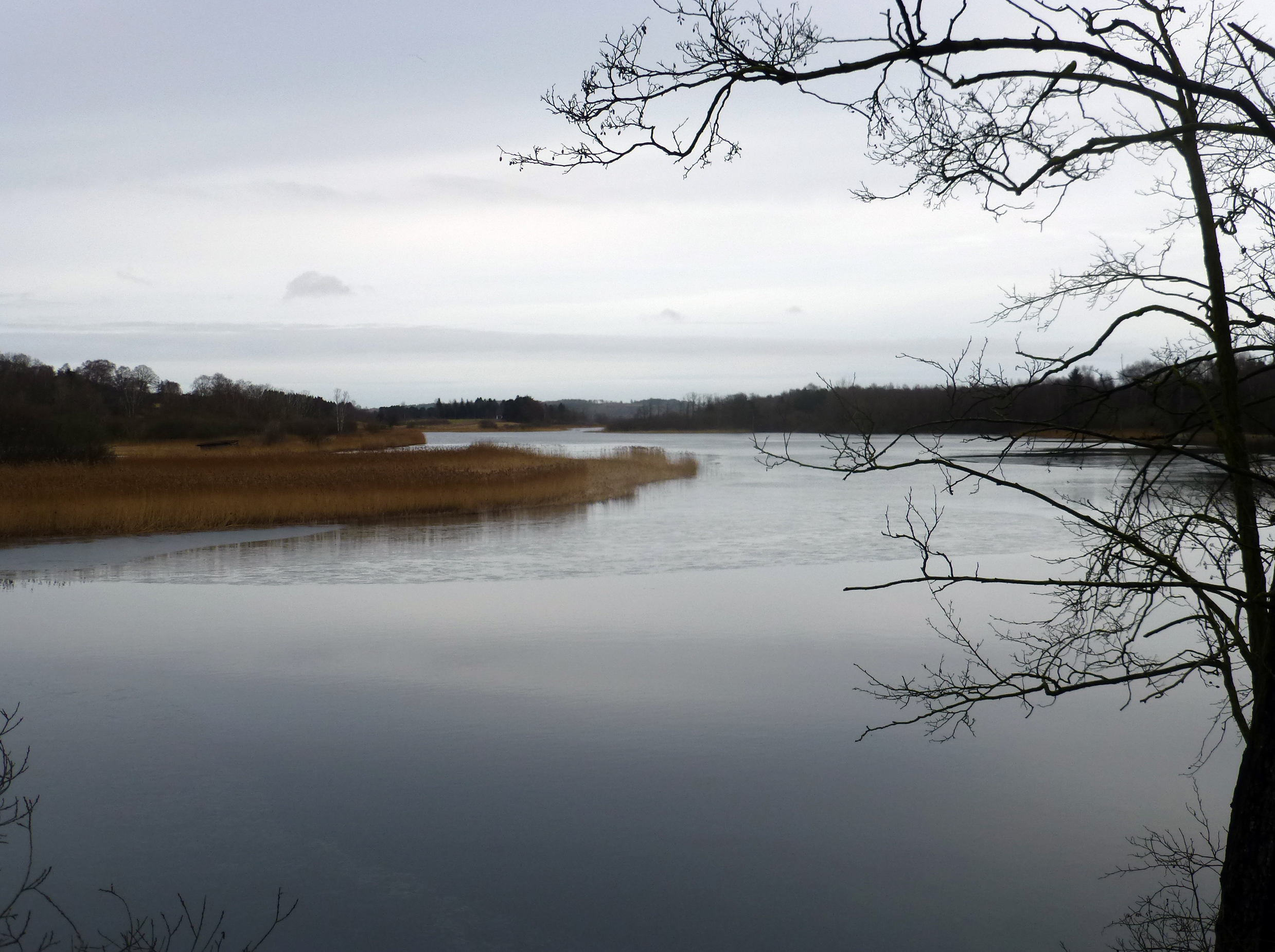

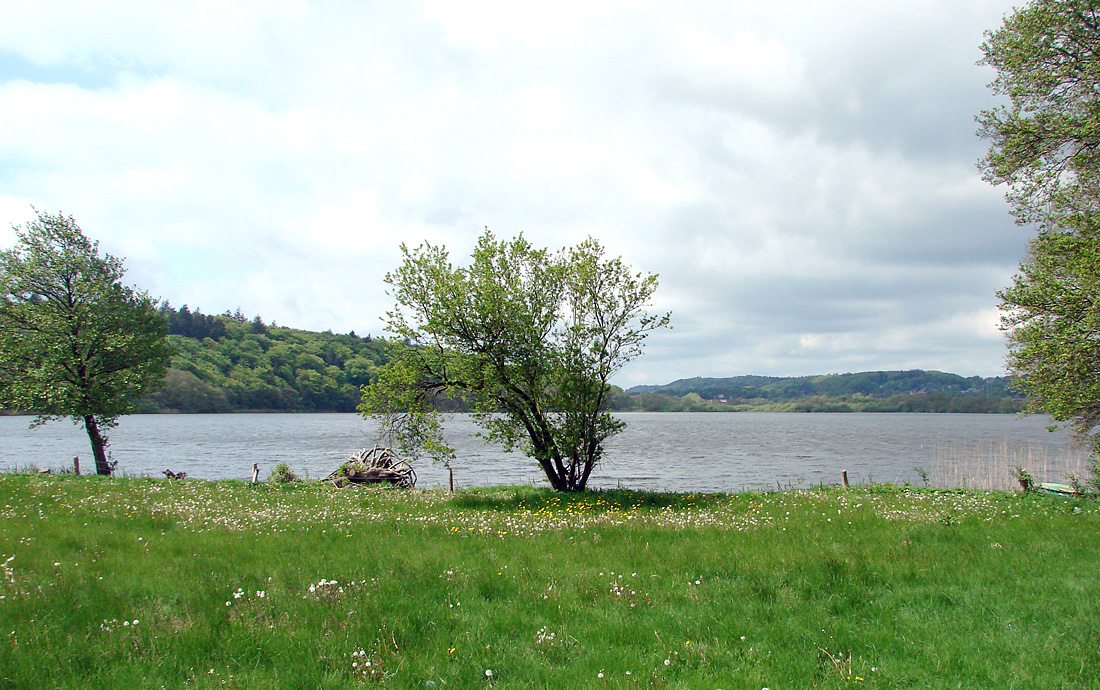

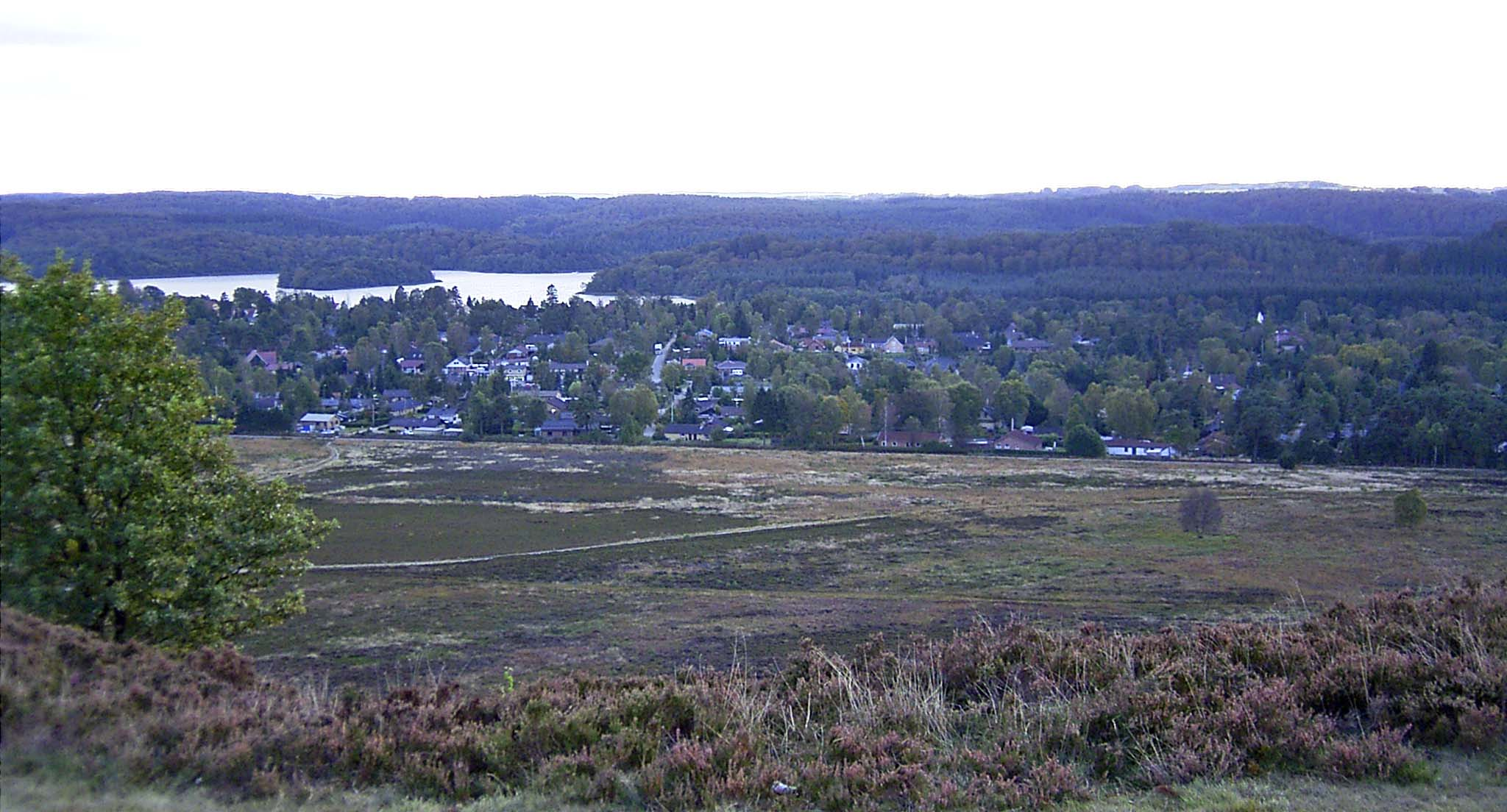

== Sources ==
- Søhøjlandet Danske Bjerge (in Danish)
