= SS Hjejlen =

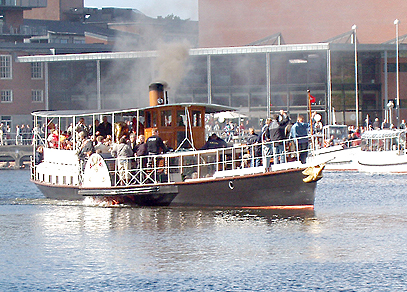
- Hjejlen in Silkeborg, 2005

History
- Name: Hjejlen
- Owner: Hjejleselskabet
- Route: Silkeborg – Himmelbjerget
- Builder: Baumgarten & Burmeister
- Completed: 1861
- Maiden voyage: 11 June 1861
- In service: 24 June 1861
- Status: Active

General characteristics
- Class & type: Paddle steamer
- Length: 25.7 m (84 ft)
- Beam: 3.8 m (12 ft)
- Draft: 1.7 m (5.6 ft)
- Speed: 8 knots (15 km/h; 9.2 mph)
- Capacity: 165
- Crew: 4

SS Hjejlen (Danish for The Golden Plover) is the world's oldest coal burning operational paddle steamer, built in 1861 by Baumgarten & Burmeister, commissioned by a group of citizens headed by paper manufacturer Michael Drewsen. She is used to carry tourists between Silkeborg and Himmelbjerget, but in 1932 she also became a public mail boat.

== Engine ==
Hjejlen's steam engine has two cylinders, each with a bore of 10 cm (3.9 in) and a stroke of 42 cm (17 in). The engine yields 40 horsepower (30 kW) and propels the vessel at up to 8 knots (15 km/h; 9.2 mph).

== Hjejlen's 150th anniversary ==
In 2011 Hjejlen celebrated her 150th anniversary with Queen Margrethe II in attendance. A commemorative coin was issued by the National Bank of Denmark.
