= Himmelbjerget =

Hill in Denmark

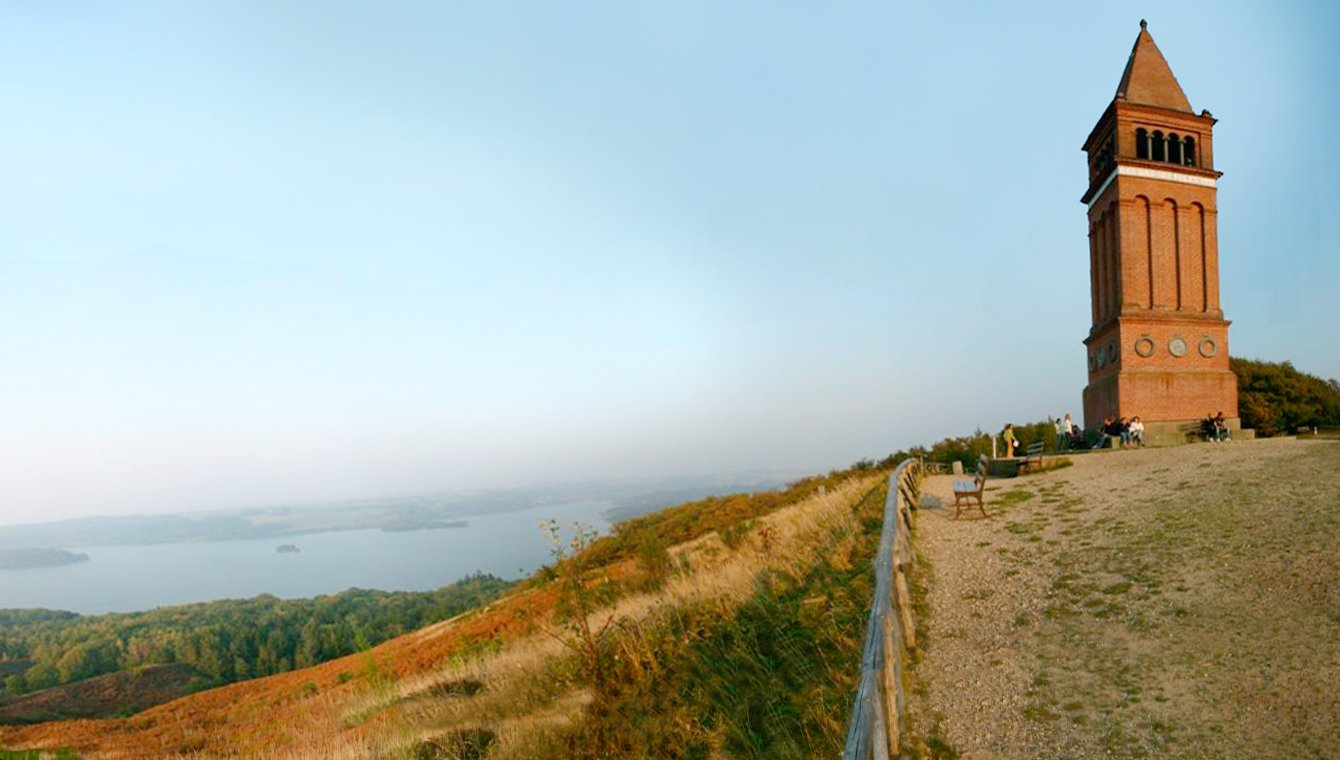
- Himmelbjerget offers a unique and grand vista of the Silkeborg lakes and Silkeborg Forests

Highest point
- Elevation: 147 m (482 ft)
- Coordinates: 56°6′18.61″N 9°41′6.18″E

Geography
- Location within Denmark
- Location: Søhøjlandet, Denmark

Himmelbjerget ("The Sky Mountain" or "The Mountain of Heaven") is a hill located between Ry and Silkeborg, Denmark in the area known as Søhøjlandet.

With an elevation of 147 m (482 ft), Himmelbjerget is one of the highest natural points in the Danish landscape. The hill and surrounding area has been a centre for various gatherings and celebrations for more than 200 years and in 1875, a red brick tower was erected at the top.

== Height and prominence ==
Himmelbjerget was believed to be the highest natural point in Denmark until 1847, when Ejer Bavnehøj was measured as the highest point. Following a scientific survey in 2005, Møllehøj was established as the highest natural point, at 170.86 m (560.6 ft). Himmelbjerget is now ranked eighth-highest hill behind Møllehøj, Yding Skovhøj, Ejer Bavnehøj and more. However, when it comes to the size of the slope, Himmelbjerget is much more impressive than the other three: there is a height difference of 121 m (397 ft) from the lake Julsø below to the top of the hill, which is remarkable by Danish standards. An amusing detail is the sign "to the boat" at the peak.

== Historic importance ==
Himmelbjerget grew to fame in Denmark during the 19th century, as people gathered there to admire the magnificent views and celebrate the birth of the Danish nation. On top of the hill is a 25.1 m-tall (82 ft) tower, that was erected in 1875 to honour King Frederik VII and his role in giving the Danish people the country's first constitution in 1849, thereby ending the preceding era of absolute monarchy. Close to the top are more monuments, most honouring individuals, but also one to commemorate women's right to vote in 1915.

In those days, several steamboats began ferrying visitors back and forth to Himmelbjerget, from various destinations across Julsø and The Silkeborg Lakes. This tradition is still alive and the historic steamship Hjejlen ("The Golden Plover") carries passengers there from Silkeborg.

== Hiking ==
There are several hiking routes in the larger area of Søhøjlandet and the major route of Hiking Route Aarhus-Silkeborg, is passing through the area of Himmelbjerget. There are also plenty of opportunity to small scale hiking experiences on and around the hill itself.

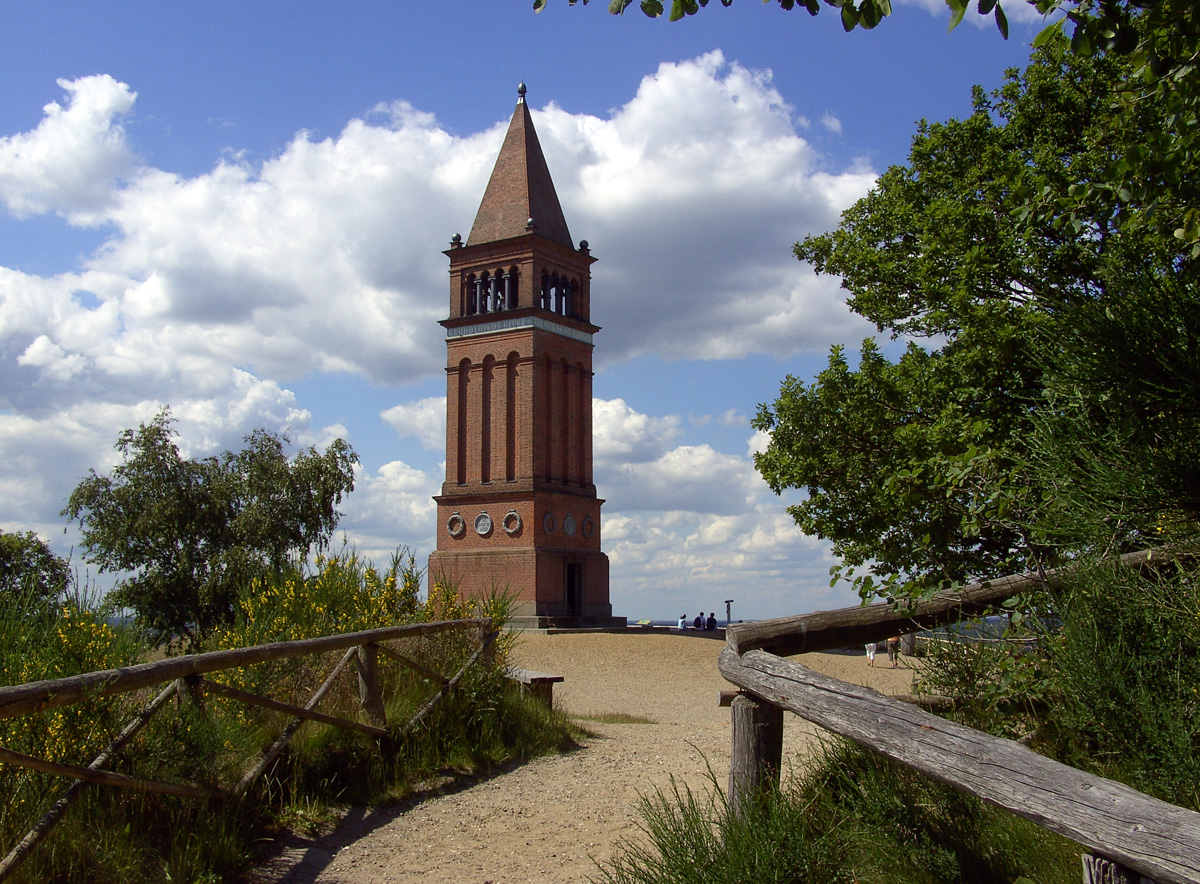
The red brick tower on the hill top.

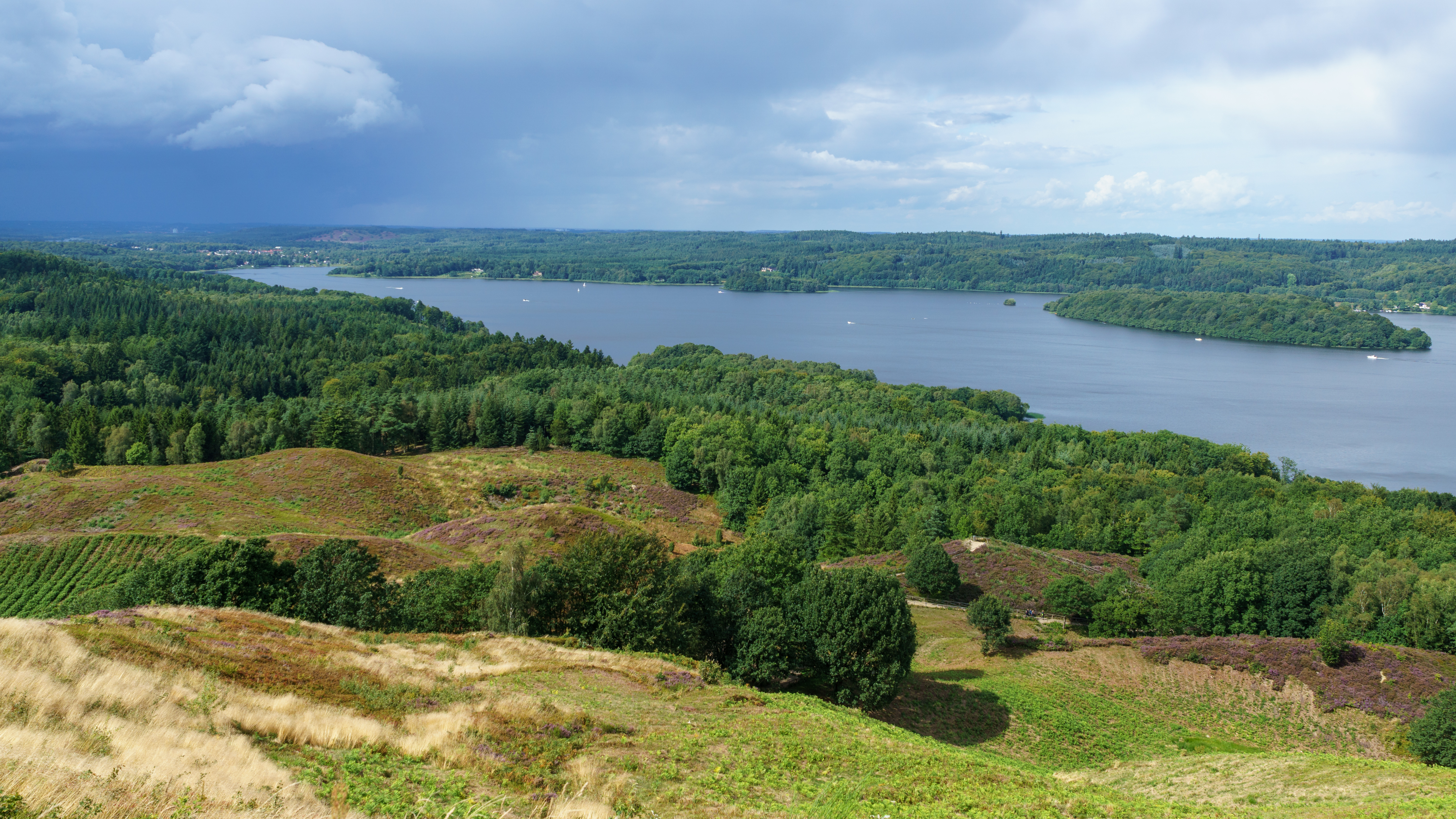
The view from Himmelbjerget to Julsø.

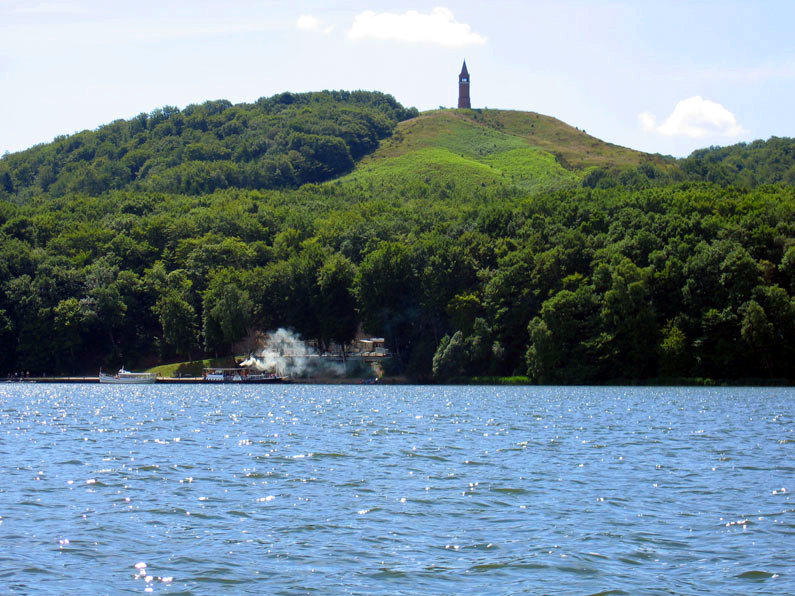
Himmelbjerget with the steam ship Hjejlen in the foreground.

== See also ==
- Møllehøj
- List of hills and mountains in Denmark

== Sources ==
- Himmelbjerget Tårnkomitéen (English: the tower committee). Official homepage in English.
- Himmelbjerget - not the tallest but the most beautiful The Nature Agency. (in Danish)
