= Silkeborg =

Town in Central Denmark

- Town
- Silkeborg
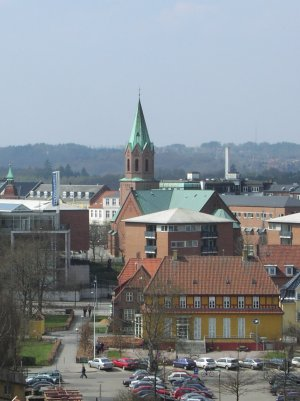
- View of Silkeborg church (built 1877), looking north-west

- Coat of arms

- Location in Denmark Silkeborg (Central Denmark Region)
- Coordinates: 56°11′00″N 9°33′06″E
- Country: Denmark
- Region: Central Denmark (Midtjylland)
- Municipality: Silkeborg

Area
  - Urban: 29.6 km^{2} (11.4 sq mi)
- Elevation: 31 m (102 ft)

Population (2026)
  - Urban: 53,058
  - Urban density: 1,790/km^{2} (4,640/sq mi)
  - Gender: 25,850 males and 27,208 females
- Demonym: Silkeborgenser
- Time zone: UTC+01:00 (Central Europe Time)
  - Summer (DST): UTC+02:00
- Postal code: 8600
- Area code: (+45) 89
- Website: Silkeborg Kommune

Silkeborg (Danish: [ˈse̝lkəˌpɒˀ]) is a Danish town with a population of 53,058 (1 January 2026). Silkeborg is the seat of Silkeborg Municipality, with a population of 102,753 as of 2026.

Silkeborg is located in the middle of the Jutlandic peninsula, slightly west of the geographical centre of Denmark. The city is situated on the Gudenå River in the hilly and lush landscape of Søhøjlandet, surrounded by Denmark's largest forest district and a great number of lakes. Silkeborg is also known as Denmark's outdoor capital. The lakes between Silkeborg and Ry that are linked by the Gudenå, are known collectively as Silkeborgsøerne (the Silkeborg lakes). The city is divided along an east–west axis by the lake of Silkeborg Langsø, which at the eastern side of the city, flows into the Gudenå River.

== History ==
Silkeborg was the site of a castle, a monastery and a farming estate, established in the 15th century, some 6 km from Alling Abbey. The modern town grew around the Drewsen og Sønner paper mill, established in 1844. Silkeborg Papirfabrik (Silkeborg Paper mill) was located near the Gudenå River where Silkeborg castle once stood, in order to exploit the river as a source of energy for the mill, as a resource for paper production and as a means of transport. Michael Drewsen, regarded as the founder of the city, was responsible for the daily management of the mill. A statue of Michael Drewsen now stands in front of the old city hall in the town square.

A commission to establish Silkeborg as a trading centre was set up in 1845. The site grew into a small settlement, from a population of 30 in 1844 to 556 in 1850 and to 1,204 in 1855. The City Council and the Parish were both established in 1855. The railway was built in 1871.

Silkeborg was given the status of market town (købstad) in 1900. The population was recorded as being 7,228 in 1901, and 8,792 in 1911.

During the German occupation of Denmark in World War II, the Gestapo turned the Silkeborg Bad (Silkeborg Baths), which had until then served as the municipal sanatorium, into its Danish headquarters. The remnants of German bunkers can still be seen today, and one of these bunkers is now a public museum.

== Geography ==
Silkeborg is located in the region known as Søhøjlandet (lit.: the lake-highland) in mid-eastern Jutland. The landscape consists mostly of lakes, extensive woodlands (such as the Silkeborg Forests) and some of the highest points in Denmark, including Himmelbjerget. It is also one of the most expensive areas in Denmark in which to live, and the neighbouring village of Sejs is known for its particularly large mansions and lakeside villas at Brassø.

== Economy ==
For many years the paper mill (Silkeborg Papirfabrik) was the most prominent business in the city, but during the 1990s it suffered financial difficulties. In 1993, the German corporation, Drewsen Spezialpapiere, bought the mill, but in 2000 decided to close it. An urban renewal project turned the industrial area closest to the city centre partly into a new commercial district with a hotel, a cinema, a concert hall, restaurants and cafés; and partly into a new residential neighbourhood with modern apartment buildings.

The city has a large number of car dealerships, and is also the headquarters of Jyske Bank, Denmark's third-largest bank.

== Main sights ==
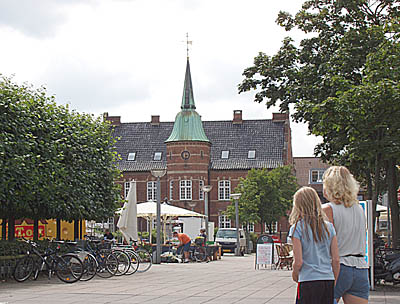
Old Town Hall

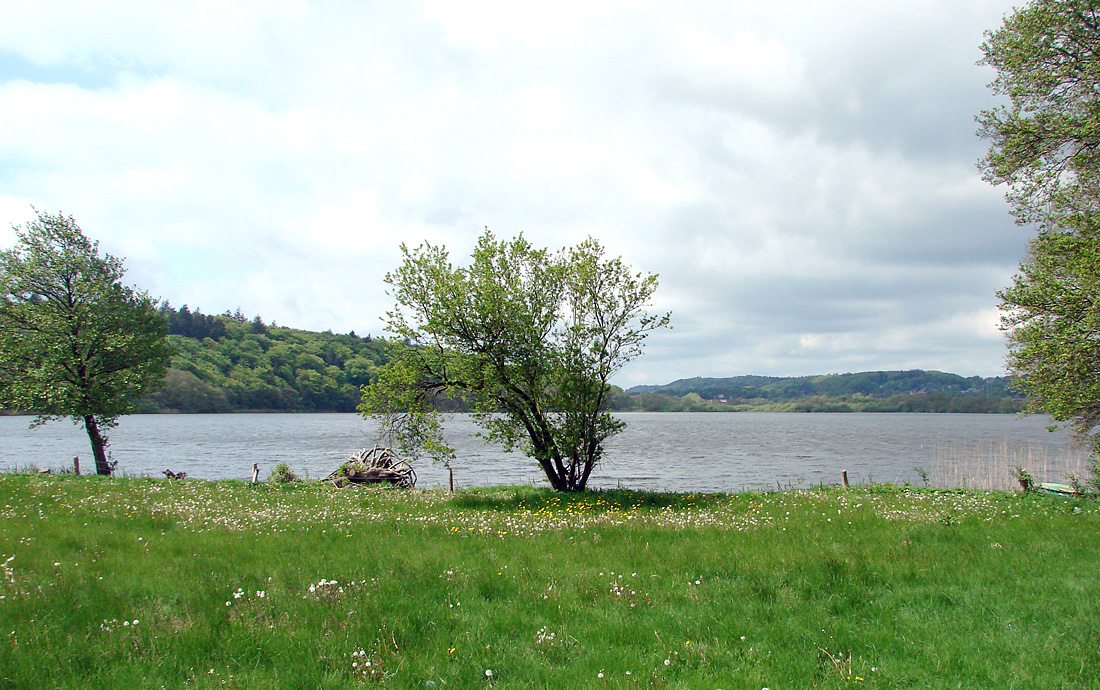
Lake Ørnsø

- Silkeborg Museum: The oldest preserved building in the city is Silkeborg Manor, constructed in 1767. This building is now Silkeborg Museum where the naturally mummified corpse of the Tollund man, who lived during the 4th century BC, is on display.
- City square: The old city square (Torvet) is the centre of Silkeborg and is together with the surrounding streets a pedestrian area. The city square is surrounded by the Hotel Dania (Silkeborg's oldest hotel, founded in 1848), the Old Town Hall, and the city church (Silkeborg Kirke). On the city square, there are two fountains and the bronze statue of Michael Drewsen, the founder of Silkeborg. On Saturdays, the square hosts the city's weekly market.
- Hjejlen: The world's oldest steamboat Hjejlen is one of the tour boats that take off from Silkeborg harbor.
- Aqua: The freshwater aquarium Aqua is one of the region's best-visited sights. In the indoor aquarium and outdoor animal park, fish and animals characteristic of Danish wildlife are on show to locals and visitors alike; the main attractions being fish, birds, otters, beavers and racoons.
- Museum Jorn: Silkeborg was the home city of COBRA painter Asger Jorn, and many of his most famous paintings can be seen at the museum named for him.
- Silkeborg Bad: The former sanatorium, Silkeborg Bad served as headquarters for the Nazi German Gestapo during World War II. A Bunker Museum is now located in the park and in the old sanatorium buildings houses an art museum. Many of the museum's sculptures can also be seen in the park for free. The natural spring, Arnakkekilden, is located in the park next to Lake Ørnsø. Danish brewery Carlsberg has used the water for bottled spring water for many years.
- Himmelbjerget: The third highest point in Denmark is called Himmelbjerget and is not exactly located in the city, in fact not even in Silkeborg County. However, it remains a sight closely linked to the city as tour boats all summer depart from Silkeborg Harbour.
- Lake fountains: The fountains in Silkeborg Langsø are among the largest in northern Europe and are a landmark of the city. Constructed in 1970 the fountains are actually built into the lake in front of City Hall. The fountains have a magnificent light show and after dark the water cascades change colour. The colour change is programmed to last 30–40 minutes.
- Indelukket: The marina and recreation area Indelukket is located close to Museum Jorn, and is a popular spot for social gatherings over the summer months. There is a park, a restaurant and Denmark's oldest miniature golf course.

== Yearly events ==
- The SCC country music festival has been an annual event since 1986. The festival takes place in Indelukket during the second weekend of August.
- The Riverboat Jazz Festival takes place the last weekend of June every year. The festival is not connected with a single location, but instead various stages can be found around the city, most prominently at the harbour and the city square.
- Hede Rytmer (English: Hot rhythms) is an annual rock and pop festival held in Indelukket at the beginning of the summer. In 2011 Boney M., 10CC and The Orchestra, the former Electric Light Orchestra played at the 3-day festival.
- Silkeborg Reggae Festival, also known as Raggapak, was a reggae festival.

== Regatta ==
Since 1899 Silkeborg has hosted an event called "Ildfestregatta", which means "fire party regatta". The event is held once every three years. During the regatta the city streets are closed to traffic in the evening, becoming temporary venues where live music is performed, merchandise is sold from stalls, and an amusement park operates. The houses next to the Gudenå River are decorated with colourful lamps, as are the many boats that enter the port at this time.

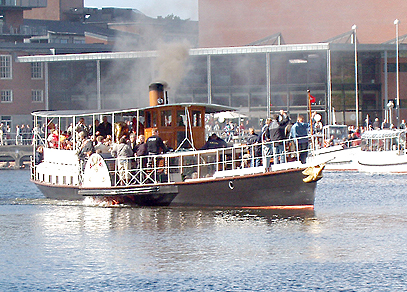
Hjejlen ("The Golden Plover") is a historic steamboat that sails from Silkeborg to Himmelbjerget. In the background can be seen the city's former paper mills, now home to the Radisson-SAS Hotel and other shops.

On Wednesday, Thursday and Friday at 0:00 p.m., there is an unofficial Danish fireworks championship. Each day, a different company puts on a fireworks display and the winner is announced on Saturday. On Saturday evening, the winner from three years before puts on a major firework show sponsored by the City Council. Nowadays the fireworks are fired from a huge raft on Silkeborg Lake just next to City Hall, however, in years gone by, the show was done from the roof of the old paper mill.

== Sports ==
The two most popular sports in Silkeborg are football and handball. The city's professional football team, Silkeborg IF, play in Danish football's highest league, the Danish Superliga. The team has won the League Trophy once, in 1994; the Danish Cup in 2001; and the UEFA Intertoto Cup in 1997. Silkeborg IF plays its home matches at Silkeborg Stadion, renamed Mascot Park after the company Mascot, a textiles manufacturer, which bought the rights to the stadium name. It is located close to the city centre and has a capacity of 10,000 people.

Silkeborg's professional handball team is BSV (named after the three towns of Bjerringbro, Silkeborg, and Voel). The team is a part of the Danish Handball League, and plays its home matches at Jysk Arena, previously known Silkeborg Hallerne, a sports centre northeast of the city centre. The ladies handball team Silkeborg-Voel usually plays its home matches at Voel Hallerne about 10 km from Silkeborg.

The motor racing circuit Jyllands-Ringen is located about 5 km east of the city centre, in Resenbro. The circuit is 2.3 km long and was a part of the DTC, (Danish Touringcar Championship) and currently a part of the TCR Scandinavia Touring Car Championship and the TCR Denmark Touring Car Series.

Silkeborg IF Cykling is a cycling club based in Silkeborg. In 2004, the club created an élite amateur team, called Team Designa Køkken. Its biggest accomplishment came in 2008 when rider Jakob Fuglsang won Danmark Rundt (i.e. The Tour of Denmark).

Silkeborg has a ski resort, with natural snow in winter, and also a nylon track that allows for year-round skiing. The ski resort is located in Gjern about 15 km from the city centre. In March 2019, Silkeborg hosted the World Women's Curling Championships.

== Media ==
Silkeborg is served by two media outlets; a newspaper and a radio station. The oldest of the two is the daily newspaper Midtjyllands Avis founded in 1857 as Silkeborg Avis. It is the sixth oldest newspaper in Denmark and was founded when the town of Silkeborg had only existed for 11 years. For many years the paper had its own paper press, but now it is printed at Jyllands-Posten's facilities.

Midtjyllands Avis is now owned by the Silkeborg Avis group. This group is also the joint owner of the radio station Radio 1 (formerly known as Radio Silkeborg), a commercial radio station broadcasting online and on FM across central Jutland. The radio station tends to air a mix of pop music and local news. The sister station, Silkeborg Guld, tailors its programming for audiences interested in older Danish and English music, only interrupted by adverts. The newspaper and the radio station are both headquartered at Papirfabrikken.

On the 16th of August 2013 it was announced that Radio Silkeborg was to be handed over to the Radio ABC Group. As a consequence, five employees were made redundant, but programmes would continue to be broadcast on the same FM frequency.

== Transportation ==
- Road: Silkeborg is connected by motorways to Aarhus, Herning, Horsens, Randers and Viborg. A new motorway was completed in September 2016 connecting Silkeborg to Aarhus and Herning. Regional buses to the surrounding cities depart from the train station. Local public transport includes 12 local bus routes serving the city centre and suburbs.
- Rail: The main station, Silkeborg railway station, is on the railway line between Aarhus and Herning, with services currently operated by GoCollective. The former railway connections to Horsens, Bramming and Langå were closed in the 1960s, meaning the city has been left with eastward and westward trains only.
- Water: The Gudenå River was for many years an important transport link for passengers and cargo, but passenger transport along the river is now only available for tourists during the summer.
- Airport: Midtjyllands Lufthavn (Karup Airport) is the closest airport, located 40 km North West of the city. The airport offers several daily flights to the Danish capital, Copenhagen.

== Notable people ==
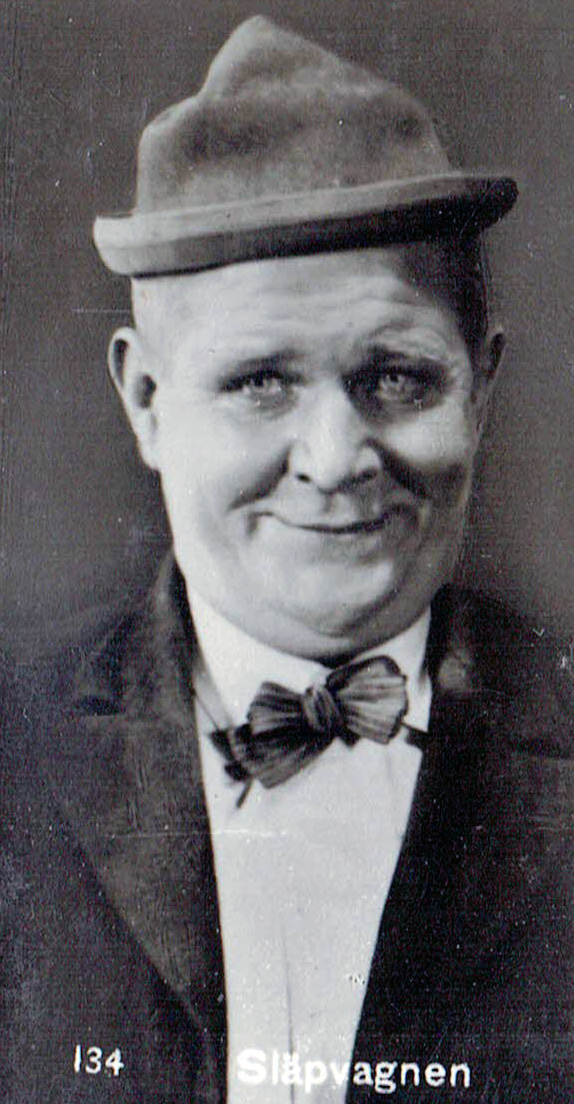
Harald Madsen, 1930s

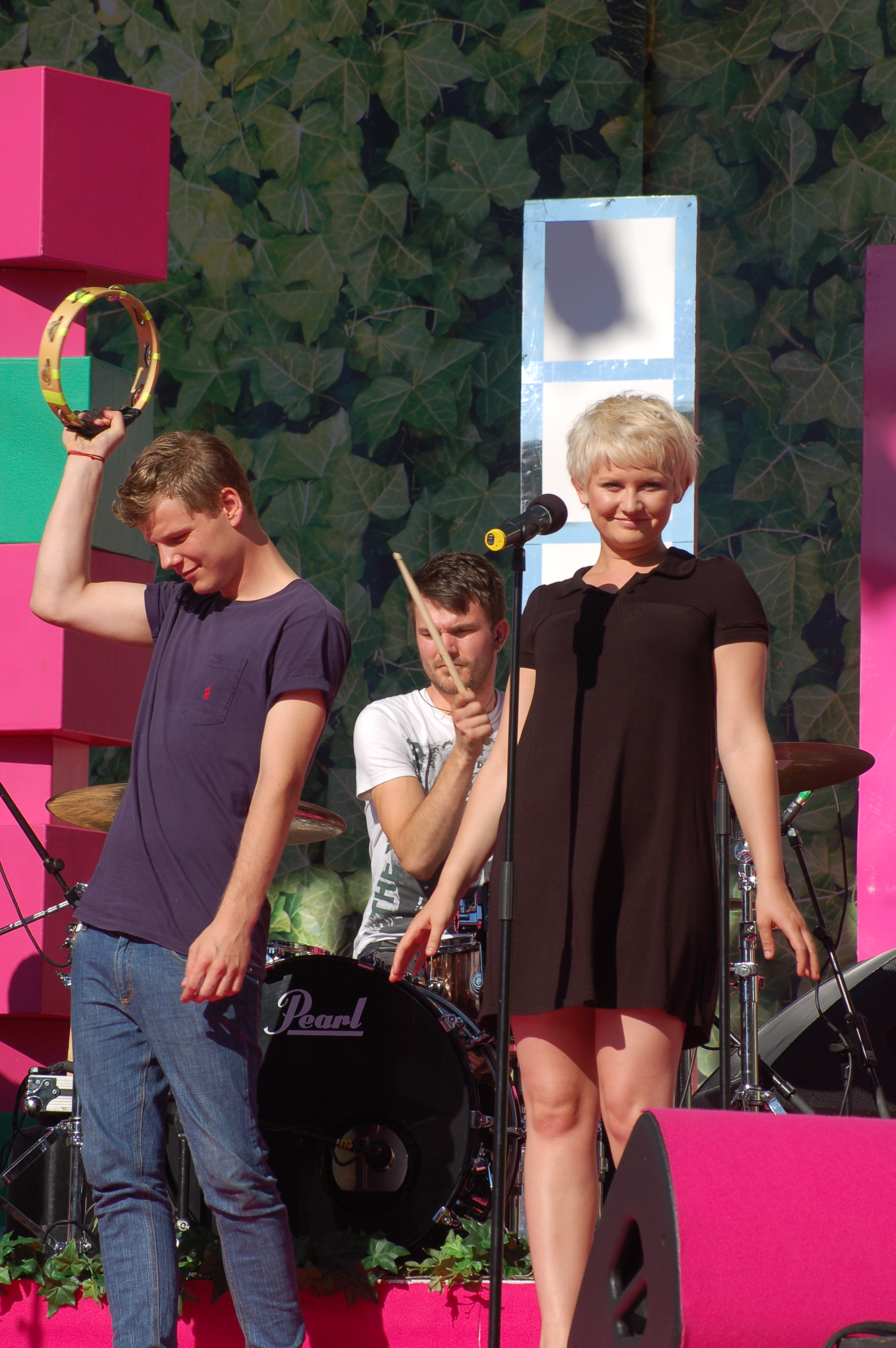
Alphabeat, 2008

=== Arts ===
- Lau Lauritzen Sr. (1878–1938), film director, screenwriter and actor in the silent film era
- Astrid Aagesen (1883–1965) Danish-Swedish designer, crafted objects from pewter and silver
- Harald Madsen (1890–1949), variety artist and film actor in popular Danish silent films
- Søren Hjorth Nielsen (1901–1983), painter and illustrator
- Erik Raadal (1905–1941), landscape painter
- Asger Jorn (1914–1973), painter, sculptor and ceramic artist; his major painting Stalingrad is in the Museum Jorn, Silkeborg
- Bodil Kaalund (1930–2016), award-winning painter, textile artist and writer
- Don Powell (born 1946), drummer with 1970s English rock band Slade, resides here with his Danish wife Hanna
- Jesper Asholt (born 1960), actor
- Maibritt Saerens (born 1970), actress
- Simon Kvamm (born 1975), Danish–Faroese actor and singer
- Rune Klan (born 1976), comedian and magician
- Ole Tøpholm (born 1977), radio host, known for his coverage of the Eurovision Song Contest
- Mads Mathias (born 1981), singer, saxophonist and songwriter
- Esben Bjerre Hansen (born 1987), radio and television host
- Martin Jensen (born 1991), DJ and record producer
- Alphabeat (formed 2006), pop band

=== Public service, business and science ===
- Theodora Lang (1855–1935), pioneer in women's education, founded Th. Lang's School in Silkeborg
- Peter Sabroe (1867–1913), journalist, politician and children's rights advocate
- Johannes Fibiger (1867–1928), physician and professor of anatomical pathology, won the 1926 Nobel Prize in Physiology or Medicine, but the basis of his prize was subsequently disproved
- Peter Esben-Petersen (1869–1942), entomologist, studied Neuroptera
- Poul Ib Gjessing (1909–1944), sea captain and member of the Danish resistance to Nazi occupation
- Lars Larsen (1948–2019), businessman, owner and founder of the Jysk retail chain, lived in Silkeborg from 1982
- Marie Jepsen (1940–2018), member of the European Parliament

=== Sport ===
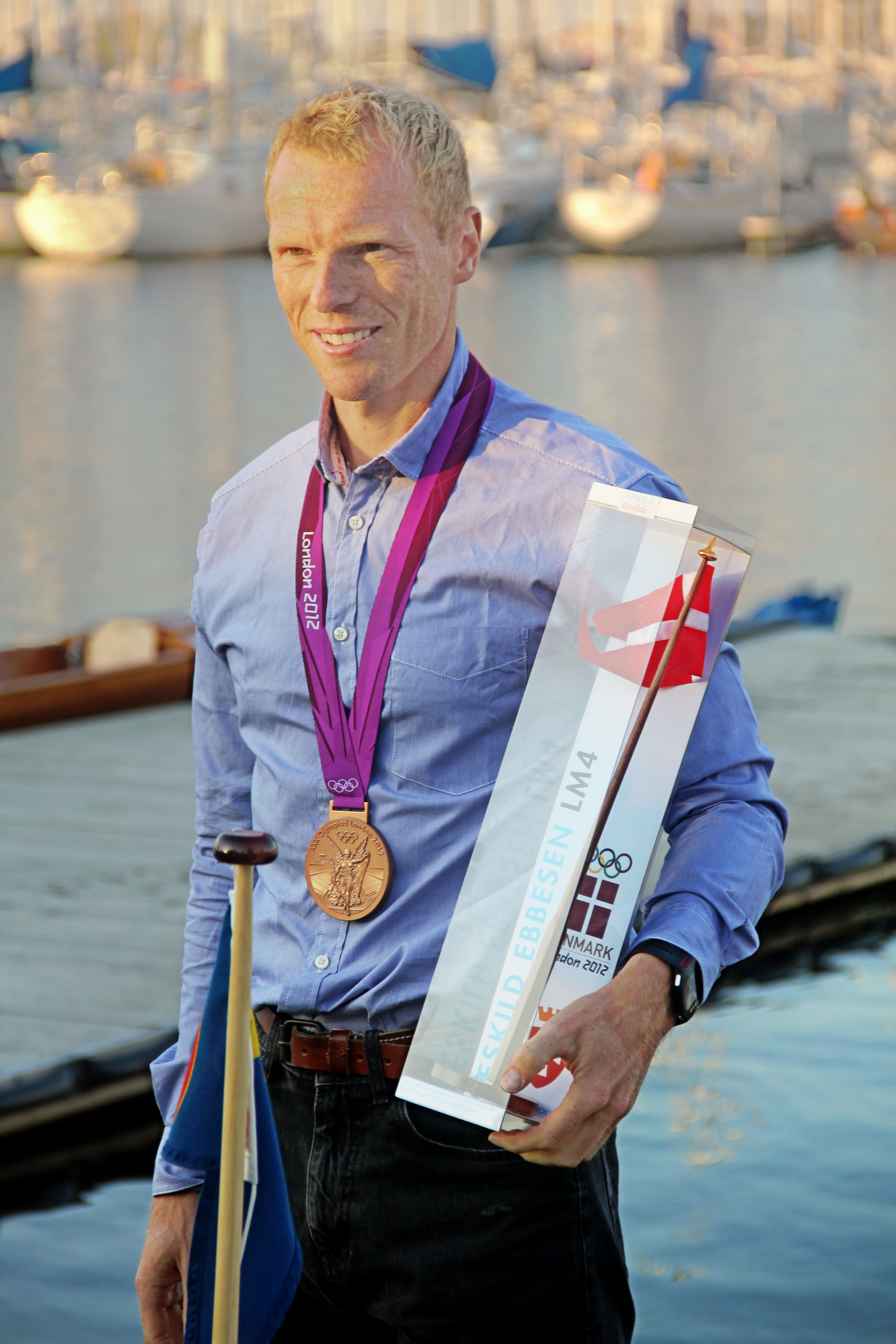
Eskild Ebbesen, 2012

- Jesper Skibby (born 1964), former professional road bicycle racer
- Thomas Bjørn (born 1971), professional golfer
- Eskild Ebbesen (born 1972), lightweight rower, has won five Olympic medals (three gold); Danish team flag bearer at the 2004 Summer Olympics
- Peter Sørensen (born 1973), footballer, played 209 games for Silkeborg IF, also served as manager
- Lars Bak (born 1980), professional road bicycle racer
- Nicolas Dalby (born 1984), mixed martial artist
- Annika Langvad (born 1984), cross-country mountain biker, Women's Cross-Country World Champion
- Martin Ørnskov (born 1985), footballer with over 350 club caps, captain at Lyngby BK
- Patrick Kristensen (born 1987), footballer, over 280 club caps with AaB Fodbold
- Morten Ørum Madsen (born 1988), professional golfer
- Simon Jakobsen (born 1990), footballer, over 200 club caps with Silkeborg IF
- Ida Bobach (born 1991), orienteering competitor, Junior World Champion in 2009
- Kasper Dolberg (born 1997), professional footballer, 17 caps for Denmark
- Emma Norsgaard (born 1999), professional road bicycle racer

== In popular culture ==
- In the 1973 film The Day of the Jackal, the main character dons a number of aliases throughout the story. One of them is a Danish schoolteacher named Per Lundqvist, who claims to hail from the town of Silkeborg.
- In the opening episode of the sixth series of Parks and Recreation Heidi Klum's character receives an award for women in government, representing Silkeborg.
- Inspired by an Asger Jorn print in a band member's home in Dublin, Ireland, Silkeborg is now also the name of an Irish band

== Twin towns – sister cities ==
Silkeborg terminated all its twinnings in 2016.

== See also ==
- Gjessø
- Them
