= Brædstrup Municipality =

Former municipality in Vejle, Denmark

Coordinates: 55°58′19″N 9°36′37″E

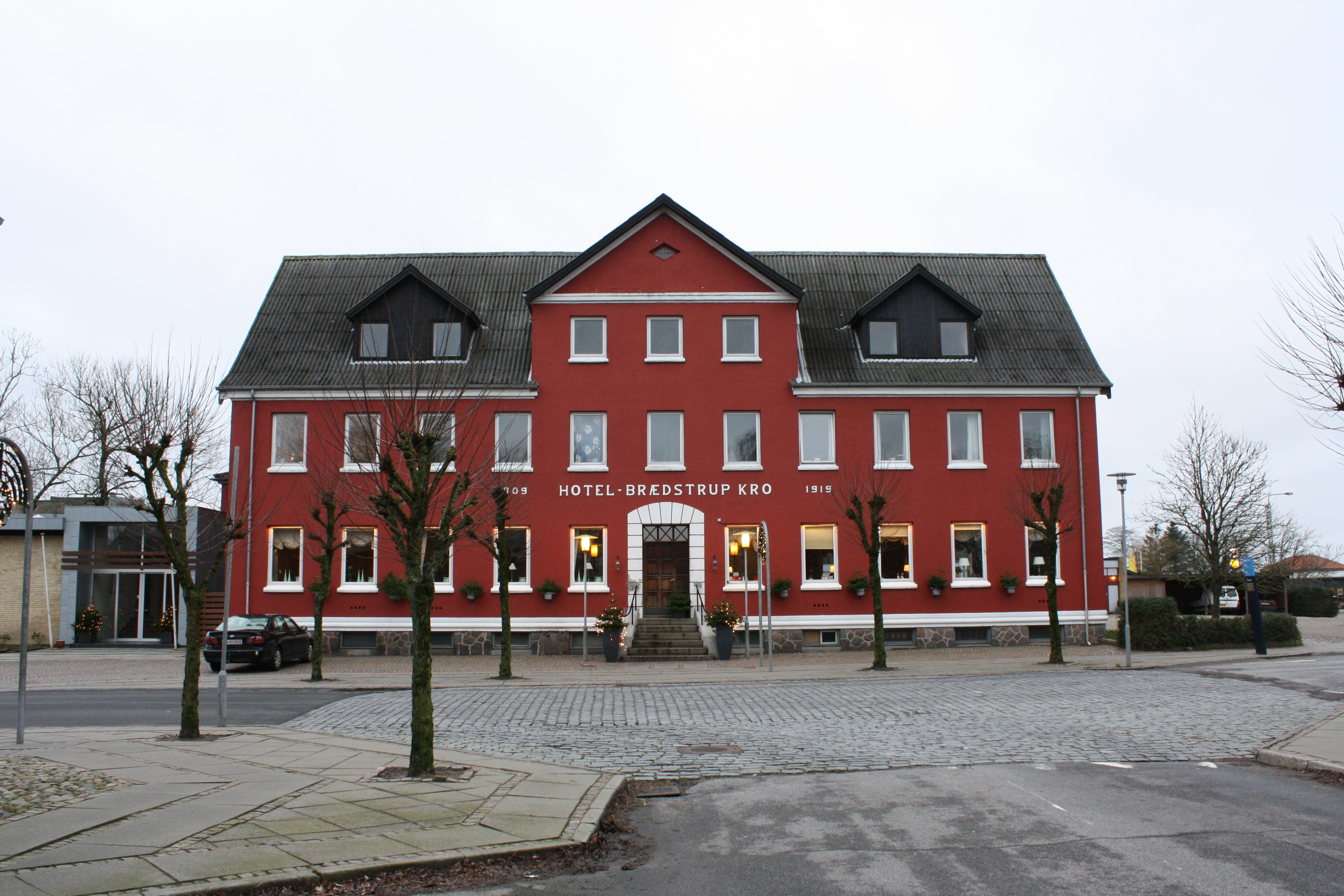
Inn established late 18th century

Until 1 January 2007, Brædstrup municipality was a municipality (Danish, kommune) in Vejle County on the Jutland peninsula in central Denmark. The municipality covered an area of 201 km^{2} (78 sq mi), and had a total population of 8,728 (2005). Its last mayor was Torkild Skifter, a member of the Venstre (Liberal Party) political party. The main town and the site of its municipal council was the town of Brædstrup.

Brædstrup municipality ceased to exist due to Kommunalreformen ("The Municipality Reform" of 2007). With the exception of Voerladegård Parish, Brædstrup municipality was merged with Gedved and Horsens municipalities to form a new Horsens municipality. This created a municipality with an area of 542 km^{2} (209 sq mi) and a total population of ca. 80,000 (2005). Voerladegård Parish was merged into Skanderborg municipality.
