= Old Town Hall (Silkeborg) =

Listed building in Silkeborg, Denmark

Coordinates: 56.1692°N 9.5486°E

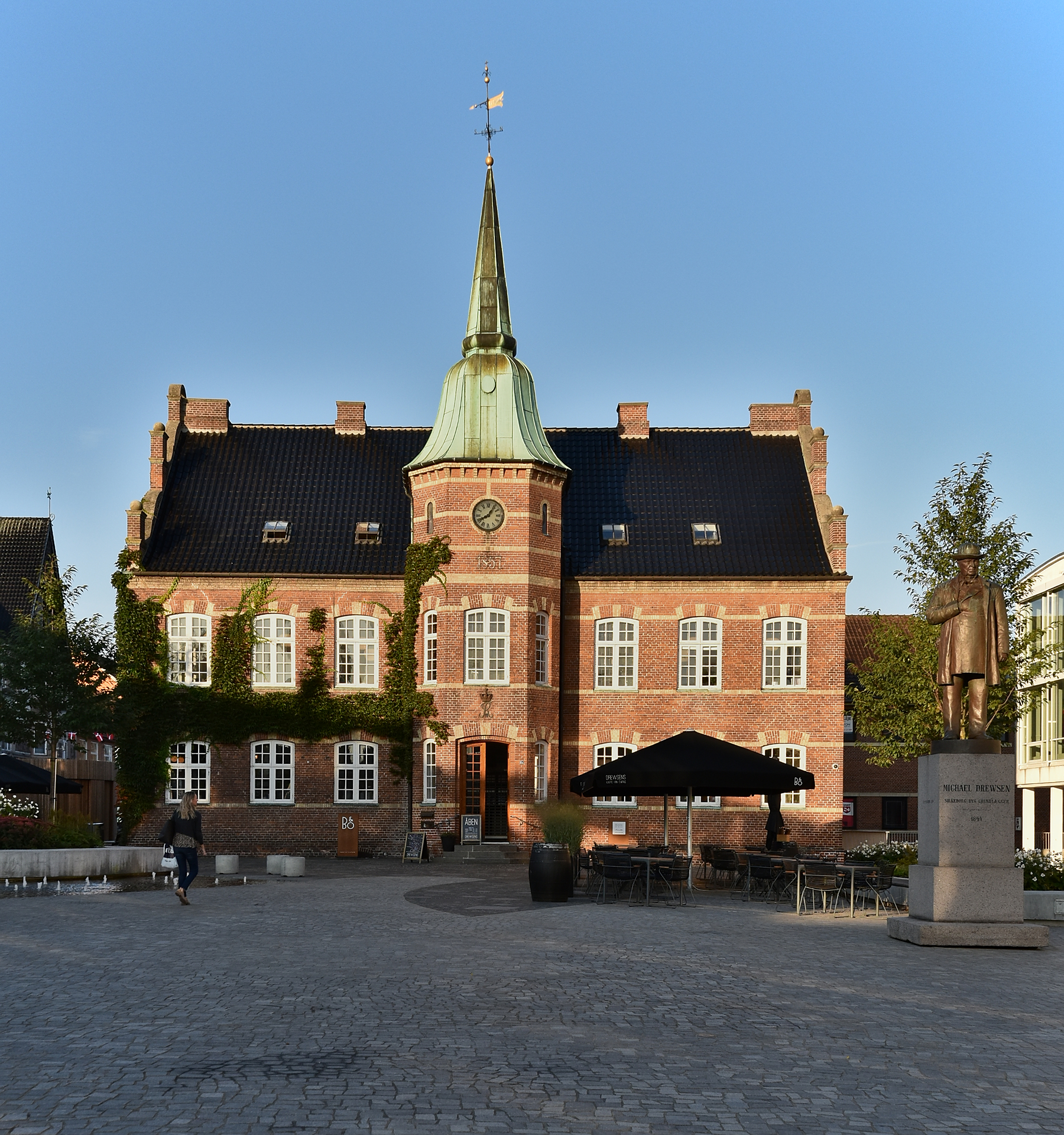
Silkeborg old town hall.

The Old Town Hall in Silkeborg, Denmark, was built in 1857 and now houses the local tourist office. It is listed.

== History ==
The town hall was built in 1857 to designs by H. C. Zeltner, who had also designed the town halls in Horsens and Skanderborg. It remained in use until 1970 when a new town hall was inaugurated on Søvej. The building was then used as a courthouse but was decommissioned in connection with the 2007 Danish Judicial Reform which reduced the number of municipalities in Denmark. It was then left empty for a couple of years.

== Architecture ==
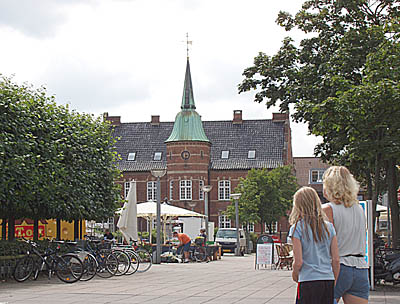
The old town hall in Silkeborg

The two-storey town hall is built in brick to a Historicist design. It has crow-stepped gables and has a short hexagonal tower with a copper-clad spire projecting from the middle of the main facade facing the square. The building was listed in 1978.

== Current use ==
The building now houses the local tourist office as well as several local organisations.
