= Voerladegård Parish =

Voerladegård Parish Voerladegård Sogn
- Parish
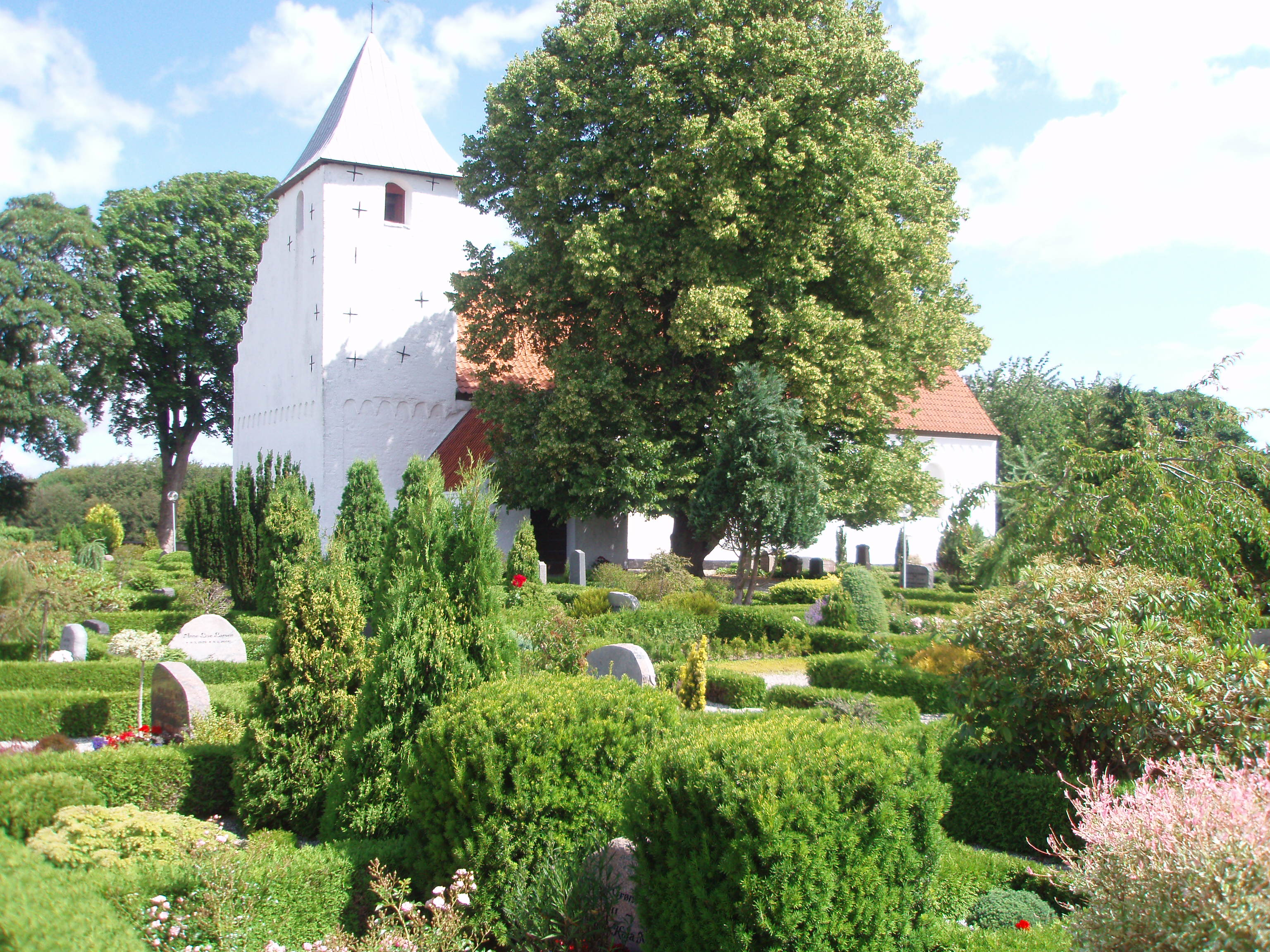
- Voerladegård Church
- Interactive map of Voerladegård Parish
- Country: Denmark
- Region: Central Denmark (Midtjylland)
- Municipality: Skanderborg
- Diocese: Aarhus

Population (2025)
  - Total: 906

Voerladegård Parish (Danish: Voerladegård Sogn) is a parish in the Diocese of Aarhus in Skanderborg Municipality. The parish contains the village of Voerladegård.

Voerladegård Parish was a part of Brædstrup Municipality until 1 January 2007 but except the rest of the municipality, who merged into the new Horsens Municipality, Voerladegård Parish merged into the new Skanderborg Municipality.
