= Herskind =

- Town
- Location in Central Denmark Region Herskind (Denmark)
- Coordinates: 56°11′3″N 9°57′45″E
- Country: Denmark
- Region: Central Denmark (Midtjylland)
- Municipality: Skanderborg

Population (2026)
  - Total: 904
- Time zone: UTC+1 (Central European Time)
  - Summer (DST): UTC+2 (Central European Summer Time)

Herskind is a village in Skanderborg Municipality, Denmark.
