= Møllehøj =

Highest natural point in Denmark

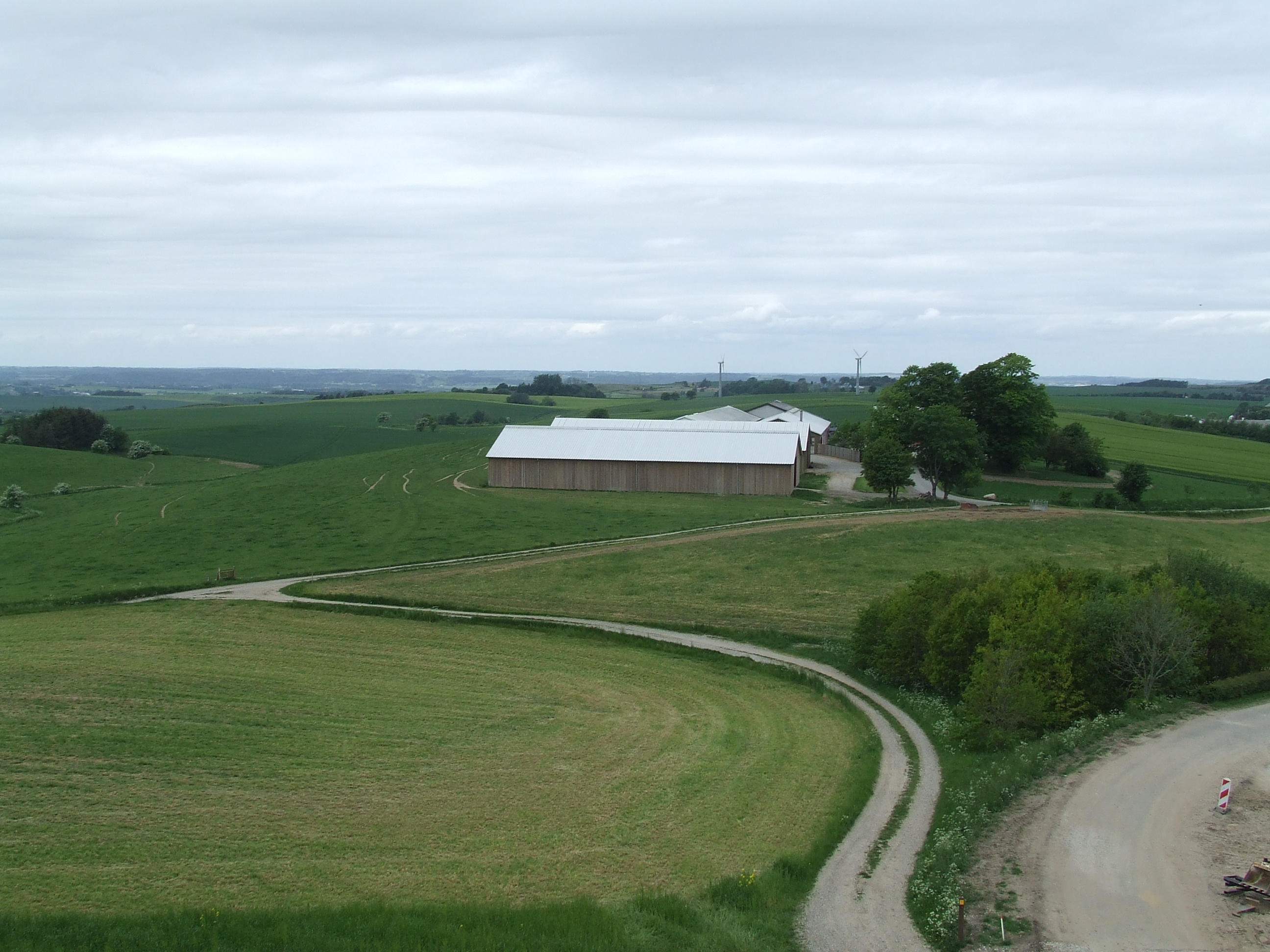
- Møllehøj seen from the tower on Ejer Bavnehøj; the highest point is obscured by the farm buildings

Highest point
- Elevation: 170.86 m (560.6 ft)
- Prominence: 161 m (528 ft)
- Isolation: 170.85 km (106.16 mi) to Håkull
- Listing: Country high point
- Coordinates: 55°58′37.88″N 9°49′34.42″E

Geography
- Location within Denmark
- Location: Skanderborg municipality, Denmark

Møllehøj (Danish: [ˈmøləˌhʌjˀ]) is the highest natural point in Metropolitan Denmark at 170.86 m (560.6 ft). (Note: For comparison, the tallest man-made structure in Denmark is the Tommerup Transmitter, which stands 321 m, or 1045 ft, high.)

== Geography ==
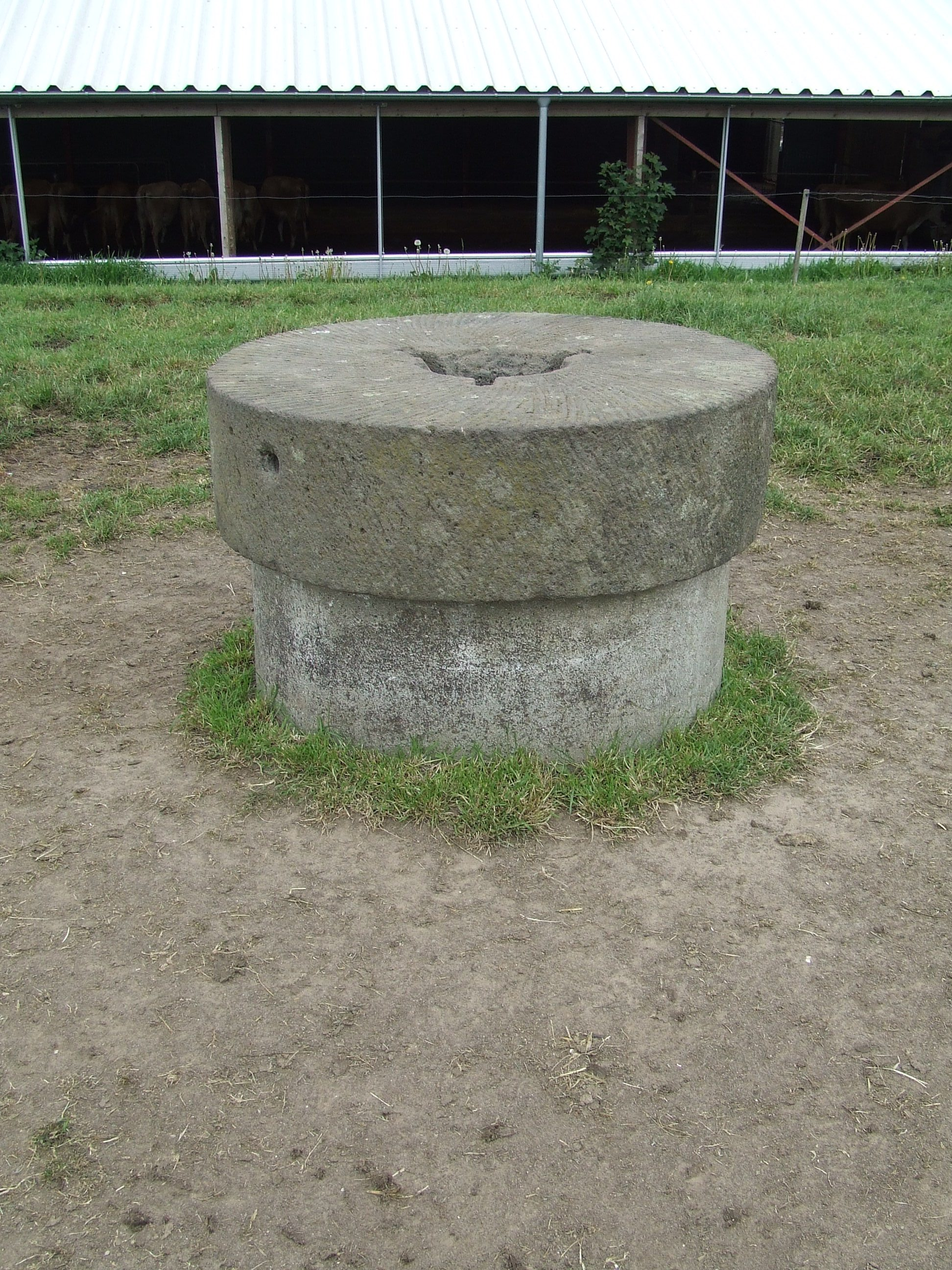
The millstone marking the top of Møllehøj

Møllehøj is in the Ejerbjerge hills in Skanderborg municipality, very close to Ejer Bavnehøj. The summit is marked with a millstone, a remnant of Ejer mill which was situated on the hill from 1838 to 1917. The mill had eight sides and had an ogee cap.

New measurements made in February 2005 showed that Møllehøj was higher than both Yding Skovhøj (172.66 m including a Bronze Age burial mound on its summit, 170.77 m without) in Horsens municipality and Ejer Bavnehøj, which had both been thought higher. These two high points' natural heights are, however, respectively 9 and 51 cm lower than Møllehøj. It was officially recognised as Denmark's highest point in 2005.

The place is located on private land next to a farm, but it has been made open for public visits. Parking should be made at Ejer Bavnehøj, 300 meters away.

== See also ==
- Himmelbjerget, which was thought to be the highest point of Denmark until 1847
- List of hills and mountains in Denmark
