= Stjær =

- Town
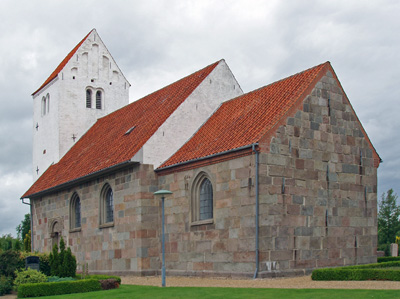
- Stjær Church

- Location in Denmark Stjær (Central Denmark Region)
- Coordinates: 56°7′2″N 9°57′12″E
- Country: Denmark
- Region: Central Denmark (Midtjylland)
- Municipality: Skanderborg

Area
  - Urban: 0.6 km^{2} (0.23 sq mi)

Population (2026)
  - Urban: 1,054
  - Urban density: 1,800/km^{2} (4,500/sq mi)
- Time zone: UTC+1 (CET)
  - Summer (DST): UTC+2 (CEST)
- Postal code: DK-8464 Galten

Stjær is a small town, with a population of 1,054 (1 January 2026), in Skanderborg Municipality, Central Denmark Region in Denmark. It is located 5 km south of Galten and 19 km west of Aarhus

Stjær Church is located in the town.
