= Yding Skovhøj =

One of Denmark's highest points

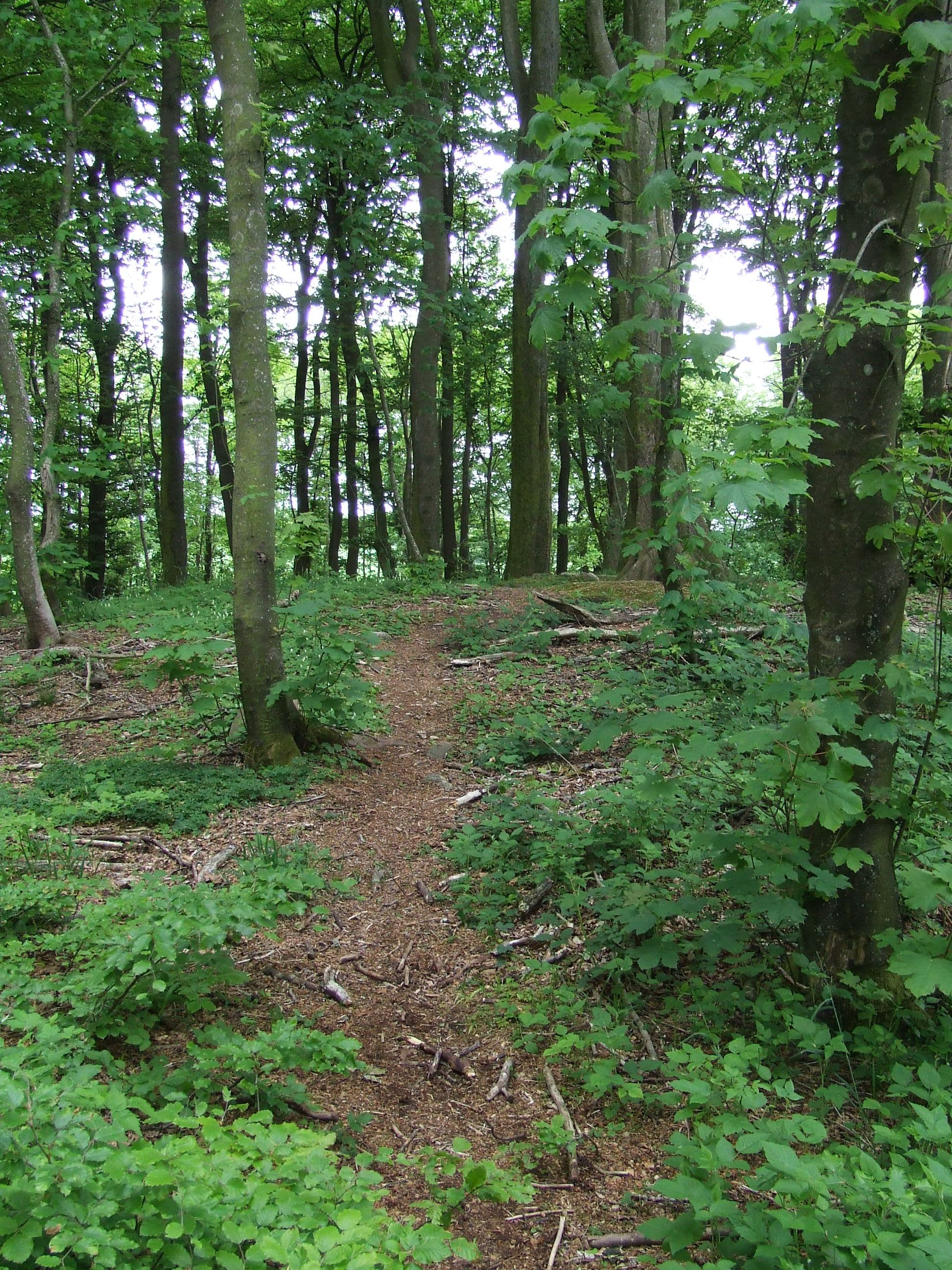
- One of the 3 Bronze Age burial mounds on Yding Skovhøj

Highest point
- Elevation: 170.77 m (560.3 ft)(172.54 m including burial mound)
- Isolation: 2.52 km (1.57 mi) to Møllehøj
- Coordinates: 55°59′33″N 09°47′45″E

Geography
- Location within Denmark
- Location: Horsens municipality, Denmark

Yding Skovhøj in Horsens municipality, Jutland is one of Denmark's highest points.

== Features ==
Its height is 172.54 m (566.1 ft) above sea level when the height of one of the Bronze Age burial mounds built on the top of the hill is included. If these man-made structures are ignored the hill's highest point is at 170.77 m (560.3 ft), which is 9 cm (3.5 in) lower than Denmark's highest natural point, Møllehøj at 170.86 m (560.6 ft). Ejer Bavnehøj is Denmark's third highest natural point at 170.35 m (558.9 ft).

Yding Forest covers the hill. Within the forest there are three Bronze Age burial mounds. Høj, from the Old Norse word haugr, can be translated to mean hill or mound. The highest point is the central mound. The eastern burial mound is 171.73 m (563.4 ft) high and the western one is 171.41 m (562.4 ft) high.

== History ==
Ejer Bavnehøj had been measured as the highest point in Denmark in the mid-nineteenth century but in 1941 new measurements established that the top of one of Yding Skovhøj's burial mounds was higher. This started a heated discussion about whether man-made structures could be counted as part of Denmark's highest point which finished with Professor N.E. Nørlund defining the highest point as being the highest natural point, without including the height of man-made piles of earth. As Ejer Bavnehøj was higher than the highest natural point of Yding Skovhøj it was then regarded as being Denmark's highest point until February 2005 when researchers discovered that in reality Møllehøj was slightly taller.
