= Ejer Bavnehøj =

Hill in Denmark

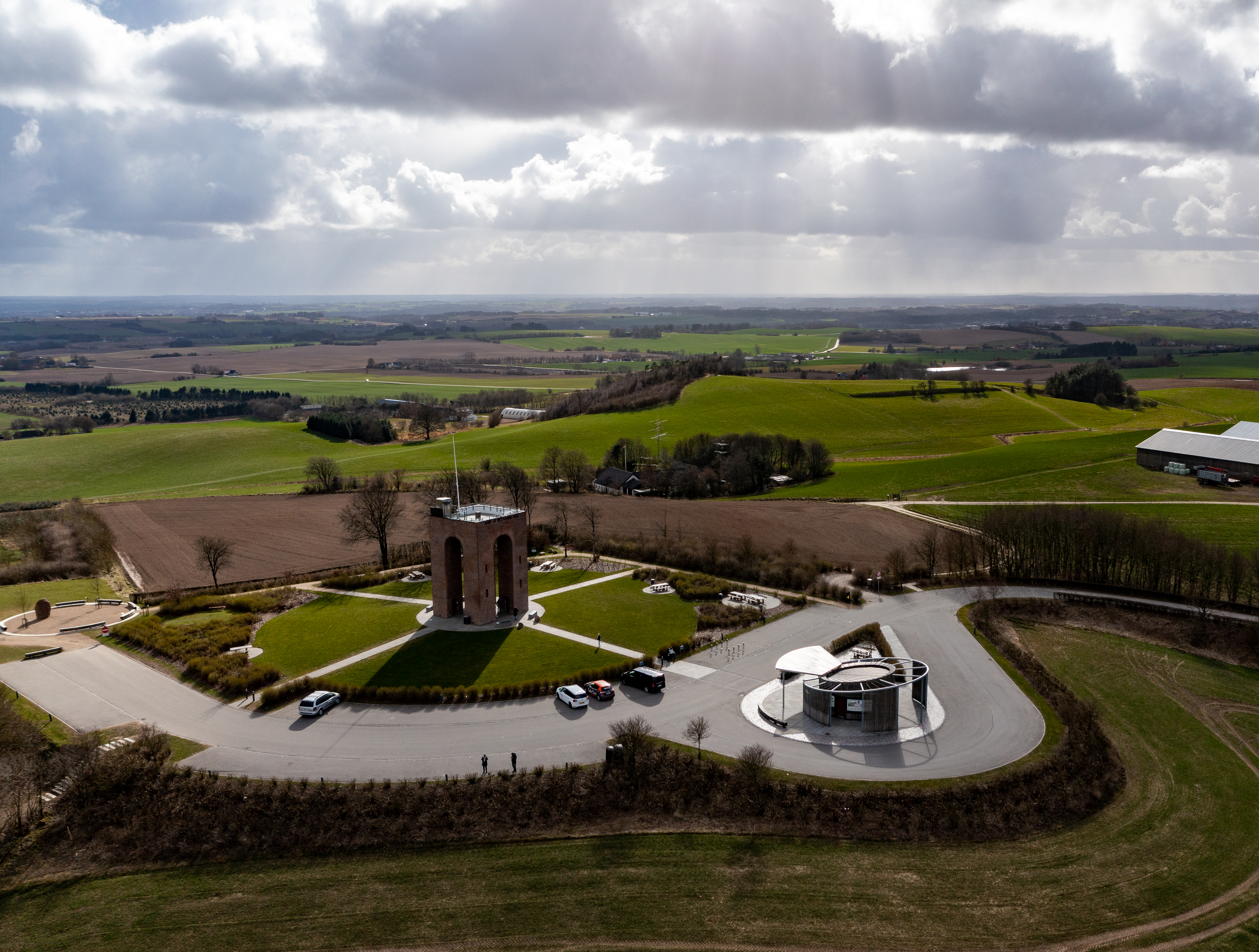
- Ejer Bavnehøj and its tower as seen from the north east. Møllehøj is located just behind the partially visible farm buildings on the far right

Highest point
- Elevation: 170.35 m (558.9 ft)
- Coordinates: 55°58′37″N 09°49′50″E

Geography
- Location within Denmark
- Location: Skanderborg municipality, Denmark

Ejer Bavnehøj (also spelled Ejer Baunehøj) is the third-highest natural point in Denmark, at 170.35 m (558.9 ft) above sea level.

== Geography ==
Ejer Bavnehøj lies in the southern part of Skanderborg municipality, between the villages of Riis and Ejer. At its summit is a 12.5 m (41 ft) tall tower, built in 1924, commemorating the reunion of the south of Jutland with the rest of Denmark after the First World War.

Close to Ejer Bavnehøj lies Yding Skovhøj, another high point, with a height of 172.54 m (566.1 ft) above sea level but this includes a human built Bronze Age burial mound. Without the Bronze Age mound Yding Skovhøj is a little lower than Denmark's highest non-man-made point, Møllehøj, which is 170.86 m (560.6 ft) high, 51 cm (1.67 ft) higher than Ejer Bavnehøj.

== History ==
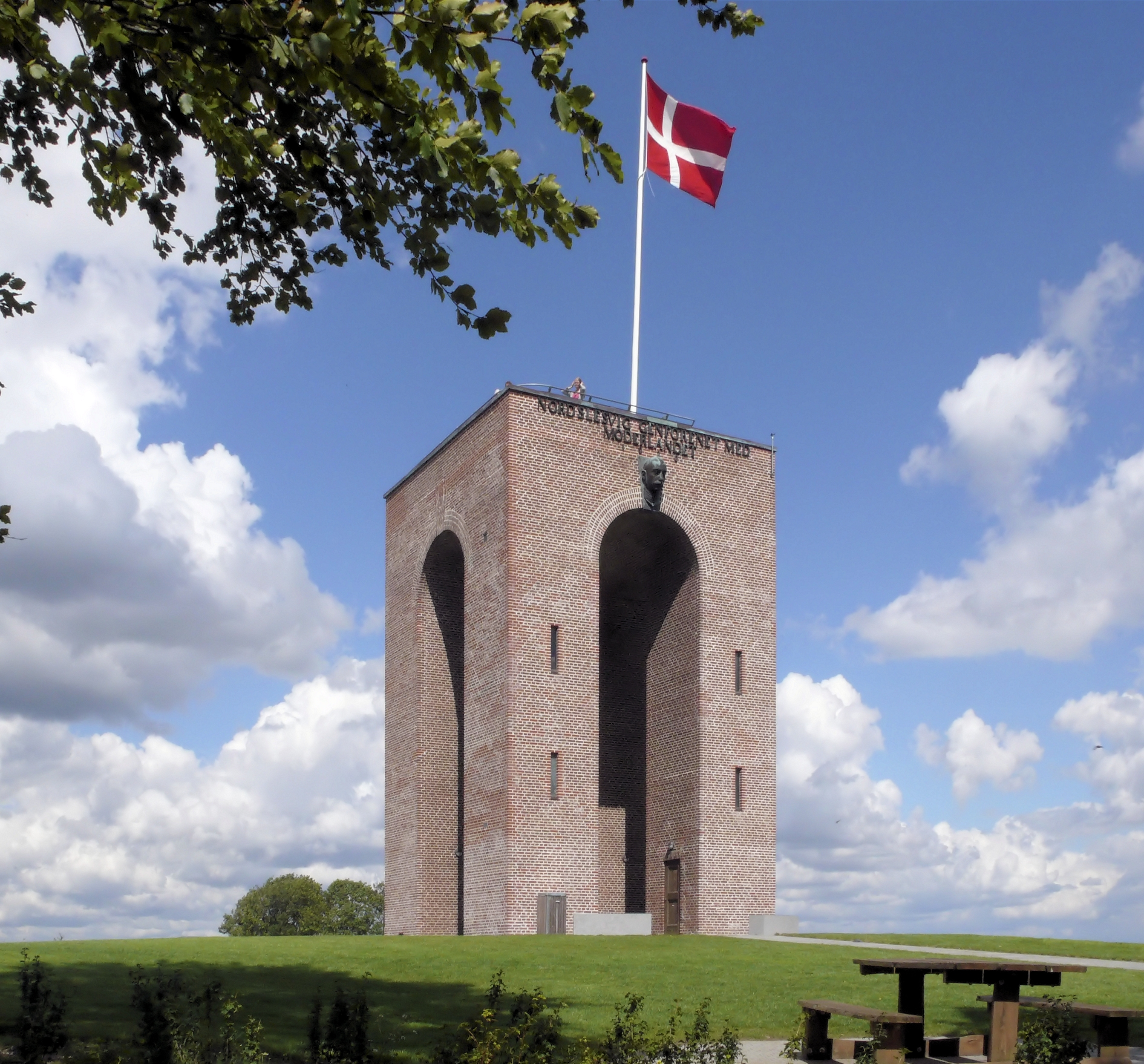
The tower of Ejer Bavnehøj

Historically Ejer Bavnehøj was mostly known as a site for a beacon where signal-fires were lit in order to warn the military and local population if the enemy were on the way. The second part of the name, "Bavnehøj", can literally be translated into "Beacon Hill" (bavne meaning "beacon" and høj, from the Old Norse word haugr, meaning hill).
