= Skanderborg Municipality =

Skanderborg Municipality Skanderborg Kommune (Danish)
- Municipality
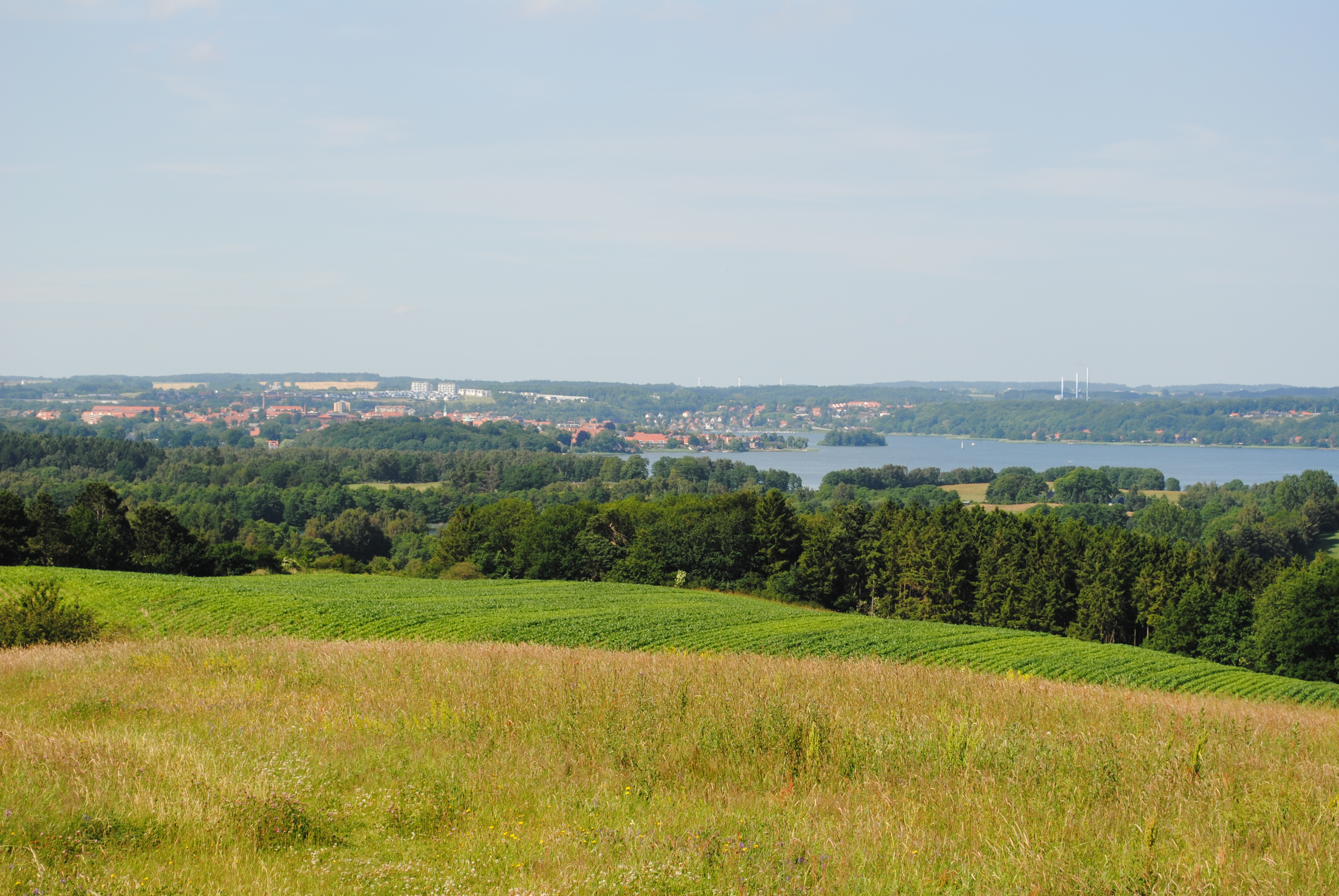

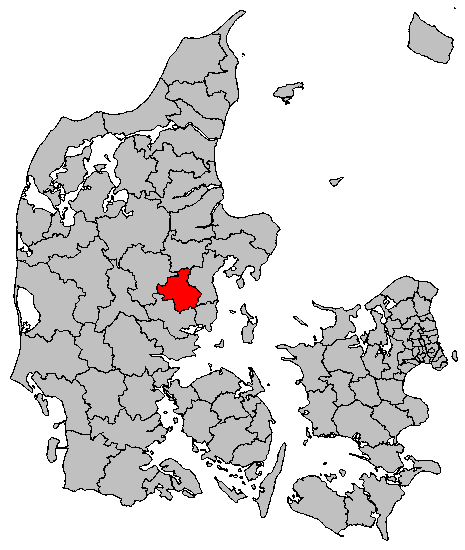
- Location in Denmark
- Coordinates: 56°02′N 9°55′E
- Country: Denmark
- Region: Central Denmark
- Established: 1 January 2007

Government
  - Mayor: Frands Fischer

Area
  - Total: 462.45 km^{2} (178.55 sq mi)

Population (1 January 2026)
  - Total: 66,352
  - Density: 143.48/km^{2} (371.61/sq mi)
- Time zone: UTC+1 (CET)
  - Summer (DST): UTC+2 (CEST)
- Website: www.skanderborg.dk

Skanderborg Municipality (Danish: Skanderborg Kommune) is a municipality (Danish, kommune) in Region Midtjylland on the Jutland peninsula in central Denmark, just southwest of Aarhus. It covers an area of 462.45 km^{2}, with a population of 66,352 (1 January 2026).

Its mayor as of 1 April 2019 is Frands Fischer, representing the Social Democrats political party.

Skanderborg is the municipality's main town, and serves as the seat of the municipal council.

On 1 January 2007 Skanderborg municipality was, as the result of Kommunalreformen ("The Municipal Reform" of 2007), merged with Galten, Ry, and Hørning municipalities, along with Voerladegård Parish from Brædstrup municipality, to form the present, expanded "Skanderborg Municipality". The former municipality covered an area of 143.22 km^{2}, and had a population of 21,745 (2003). Its last mayor was Aleksander Aagaard, a member of the agrarian liberal Venstre political party.

The municipality is part of Business Region Aarhus and of the East Jutland metropolitan area, which had a total population of 1.378 million in 2016.

== Geography ==
The municipality has two of Denmark's three highest natural points of terrain, namely Møllehøj at 170.86 metres (560.6 feet), and Ejer Bavnehøj at 170.35 metres (558.9 feet), in the southern part, southwest of the city of Skanderborg. Himmelbjerget at 147 metres (482 feet), is in the western part of the municipality, and Yding Skovhøj at 170.77 metres (560.3 feet), is in neighboring Horsens municipality, west of the other two highest points of natural terrain.

=== Locations ===
Skanderborg	19,500
Galten	8,800
Hørning	8,200
Ry	6,600
Låsby	2,000
Gammel Rye	1,500
Virring	1,000
Stjær	980
Herskind	840

== Politics ==
=== Municipal council ===
Skanderborg's municipal council consists of 29 members, elected every four years.

Below are the municipal councils elected since the Municipal Reform of 2007.

Election	Party								Total seats	Turnout	Elected mayor
Election	A	B	C	F	O	V	Ø	Å	Total seats	Turnout	Elected mayor
2005	10	2	1	2	1	13			29	74.6%	Jens Grønlund (V)
2009	11	1	1	4	1	11			29	70.8%	Jørgen Gaarde (A)
2013	12	2	1	2	2	9	1		29	78.4%	Jørgen Gaarde (A)
2017	11	2	1	2	3	8	1	1	29	77.8%	Jørgen Gaarde (A)
Data from Kmdvalg.dk 2005, 2009, 2013 and 2017

== Sources ==
- Municipal statistics: NetBorger Kommunefakta, delivered from KMD aka Kommunedata (Municipal Data)
- Municipal merges and neighbors: Eniro new municipalities map
