= 2025 Ikast-Brande municipal election =

Municipal election in Denmark

← 2021	18 November 2025	2029 →

All 23 seats to the Ikast-Brande municipal council 12 seats needed for a majority
- Turnout: 22,343 (67.2%) ▲0.5%
	First party	Second party	Third party
	V	A	C
Party	Venstre	Social Democrats	Conservatives
Last election	7 seats, 31.0%	6 seats, 23.0%	5 seats, 19.6%
Seats won	7	4	3
Seat change	0	▼2	▼2
Popular vote	6,485	4,145	2,812
Percentage	29.4%	18.8%	12.8%
Swing	▼1.6%	▼4.2%	▼6.9%
	Fourth party	Fifth party	Sixth party
	O	L	Æ
Party	Danish People's Party	Fælleslisten	Denmark Democrats
Last election	2 seats, 9.4%	2 seats, 7.2%	Did not stand
Seats won	3	3	2
Seat change	▲1	▲1	▲2
Popular vote	2,701	2,586	1,656
Percentage	12.3%	11.7%	7.5%
Swing	▲2.8%	▲4.5%	New
	Seventh party
	I
Party	Liberal Alliance
Last election	Did not stand
Seats won	1
Seat change	▲1
Popular vote	819
Percentage	3.7%
Swing	New
Mayor before election
Ib Lauritsen
Venstre
Mayor after election
Ib Lauritsen
Venstre

The 2025 Ikast-Brande Municipal election was held on November 18, 2025, to elect the 23 members to sit in the regional council for the Ikast-Brande Municipal council, in the period of 2026 to 2029. Ib Lauritsen from Venstre, would secure re-election.

== Background ==
Following the 2021 election, Ib Lauritsen from Venstre became mayor for a second term. Lauritsen sought a third term following this election.

== Electoral system ==
For elections to Danish municipalities, a number varying from 9 to 31 are chosen to be elected to the municipal council. The seats are then allocated using the D'Hondt method and a closed list proportional representation. Ikast-Brande Municipality had 23 seats in 2025.

== Electoral alliances ==
=== Electoral Alliance 1 ===
Party		Political alignment
C	Conservatives	Centre-right
I	Liberal Alliance	Centre-right to Right-wing
O	Danish People's Party	Right-wing to Far-right
Æ	Denmark Democrats	Right-wing to Far-right

=== Electoral Alliance 2 ===
Party		Political alignment
F	Green Left	Centre-left to Left-wing
L	Fælleslisten	Local politics

== Results by polling station ==
Division	A	C	F	I	L	O	V	Æ
Division	%	%	%	%	%	%	%	%
Bording	18.7	4.8	2.4	3.3	3.4	13.7	45.5	8.3
Brande	6.0	17.0	2.4	4.4	40.9	5.9	14.8	8.6
Ejstrupholm	19.8	17.4	3.5	3.0	5.3	13.3	25.3	12.4
Engesvang	31.2	2.2	5.7	1.8	1.4	26.5	26.5	4.6
Ikast	24.2	13.1	3.6	3.7	3.1	11.4	34.9	6.0
Nørre Snede	11.9	13.4	8.6	4.9	3.6	17.4	30.6	9.6

== Results ==
Party		Votes	%	+/-	Seats	+/-
Ikast-Brande Municipality
V	Venstre	6,485	29.43	-1.60	7	0
A	Social Democrats	4,145	18.81	-4.18	4	-2
C	Conservatives	2,812	12.76	-6.86	3	-2
O	Danish People's Party	2,701	12.26	+2.81	3	+1
L	Fælleslisten	2,586	11.74	+4.54	3	+1
Æ	Denmark Democrats	1,656	7.52	New	2	New
F	Green Left	829	3.76	+2.02	0	0
I	Liberal Alliance	819	3.72	New	1	New
Total		22,033	100	N/A	23	N/A
Invalid votes		67	0.20	-0.01		
Blank votes		243	0.73	+0.04		
Turnout		22,343	67.17	+0.47		
Source: valg.dk

== Opinion polls ==
Polling firm	Fieldwork date	Sample size	V	A	C	O	L	F	I	Æ	Others	Lead
Epinion	4 Sep - 13 Oct 2025	482	26.1	18.2	10.6	8.4	–	5.7	6.5	14.4	10.1	7.9
2024 european parliament election	9 Jun 2024		25.2	13.8	8.4	8.9	–	8.8	8.1	15.3	–	9.9
2022 general election	1 Nov 2022		19.7	23.6	7.2	2.7	–	4.4	8.0	16.7	–	3.9
2021 regional election	16 Nov 2021		28.1	25.9	21.3	6.5	–	3.1	1.2	–	–	2.2
2021 municipal election	16 Nov 2021		31.0 (7)	23.0 (6)	19.6 (5)	9.4 (2)	7.2 (2)	1.7 (0)	–	–	–	8.0
