= 2021 Ikast-Brande municipal election =

← 2017	16 November 2021	2025 →

All 23 seats to the Ikast-Brande Municipal Council 12 seats needed for a majority
- Turnout: 21,636 (66.7%) ▼5.8pp
	First party	Second party	Third party
	V	A	C
Party	Venstre	Social Democrats	Conservatives
Last election	9 seats, 36.0%	6 seats, 23.0%%	3 seats, 12.9%
Seats won	7	6	5
Seat change	▼2	0	▲2
Popular vote	6,620	4,905	4,186
Percentage	31.0%	23.0%	19.6%
Swing	▼5.0%	0	▲6.7%
	Fourth party	Fifth party	Sixth party
	O	L	D
Party	Danish People's Party	Fælleslisten	New Right
Last election	3 seats, 13.2%	2 seats, 8.4%	Did not stand
Seats won	2	2	1
Seat change	▼1	0	▲1
Popular vote	2,015	1,536	692
Percentage	9.4%	7.2%	3.2%
Swing	▼3.8%	▼1.2%	New
Mayor before election
Ib Lauritsen
Venstre
Mayor after election
Ib Lauritsen
Venstre

Since the 2007 municipal reform, Ikast-Brande Municipality have only had mayors from Venstre. In 2017 the traditional blue bloc parties won 15 of the 23 seats, and Ib Lauritsen would take over from Carsten Kissmeyer who did not stand for re-election.

The blue bloc would again win 15 seats in this election, however Venstre would lose 2 seats, while the Conservatives gained 2 seats. Danish People's Party would also lose a seat, while New Right, who stood for the first time in Ikast-Brande, would gain one. Eventually it was announced that Ib Lauritsen from Venstre would continue as mayor for a second term.

== Electoral system ==
For elections to Danish municipalities, a number varying from 9 to 31 are chosen to be elected to the municipal council. The seats are then allocated using the D'Hondt method and a closed list proportional representation. Ikast-Brande Municipality had 23 seats in 2021

Unlike in Danish General Elections, in elections to municipal councils, electoral alliances are allowed.

== Electoral alliances ==
=== Electoral Alliance 1 ===
Party		Political alignment
D	New Right	Right-wing to Far-right
O	Danish People's Party	Right-wing to Far-right

=== Electoral Alliance 2 ===
Party		Political alignment
C	Conservatives	Centre-right
K	Christian Democrats	Centre to Centre-right
L	Fælleslisten	Local politics

=== Electoral Alliance 3 ===
Party		Political alignment
A	Social Democrats	Centre-left
F	Green Left	Centre-left to Left-wing
Ø	Red–Green Alliance	Left-wing to Far-Left

== Results by polling station ==
Division	A	C	D	F	K	L	O	V	Æ	Ø
Division	%	%	%	%	%	%	%	%	%	%
Ejstrup	21.3	20.4	4.4	1.9	4.4	2.4	11.3	32.3	0.2	1.3
Gludsted	31.6	15.4	5.7	1.3	6.1	1.5	13.1	22.6	0.4	2.3
Nørre Snede	22.9	16.4	4.1	5.0	2.4	0.6	19.1	24.4	0.6	4.4
Klovborg	14.0	34.0	7.2	2.6	5.2	0.6	10.8	22.6	0.4	2.6
Brande	11.5	22.3	2.3	1.4	1.7	28.4	8.0	22.9	0.4	1.1
Blåhøj	5.5	25.8	3.5	0.6	2.7	43.9	6.1	11.5	0.2	0.2
Ikast	28.3	21.5	3.0	1.7	2.8	0.5	7.2	33.5	0.2	1.2
Isenvad	9.7	22.6	3.4	1.1	2.9	0.7	6.5	52.2	0.0	0.8
Bording	23.3	10.5	3.8	0.8	2.2	0.3	6.4	51.4	0.2	1.2
Engesvang	35.7	9.2	2.4	1.9	2.3	0.2	20.0	22.3	0.1	5.9

== Results ==
Party		Votes	%	+/-	Seats	+/-
Ikast-Brande Municipality
V	Venstre	6,620	31.03	-5.02	7	-2
A	Social Democrats	4,905	22.99	+0.05	6	0
C	Conservatives	4,186	19.62	+6.68	5	+2
O	Danish People's Party	2,015	9.45	-3.77	2	-1
L	Fælleslisten	1,536	7.20	-1.20	2	0
D	New Right	692	3.24	New	1	New
K	Christian Democrats	576	2.70	New	0	New
Ø	Red-Green Alliance	375	1.76	New	0	New
F	Green Left	371	1.74	-1.47	0	0
Æ	Freedom List	55	0.26	New	0	New
Total		21,331	100	N/A	23	N/A
Invalid votes		69	0.21	-0.11		
Blank votes		236	0.73	0.0		
Turnout		21,636	66.70	-5.84		
Source: valg.dk
