= Karup River =

Coordinates: 56°11′32″N 9°15′55″E

Karup River Karup Å
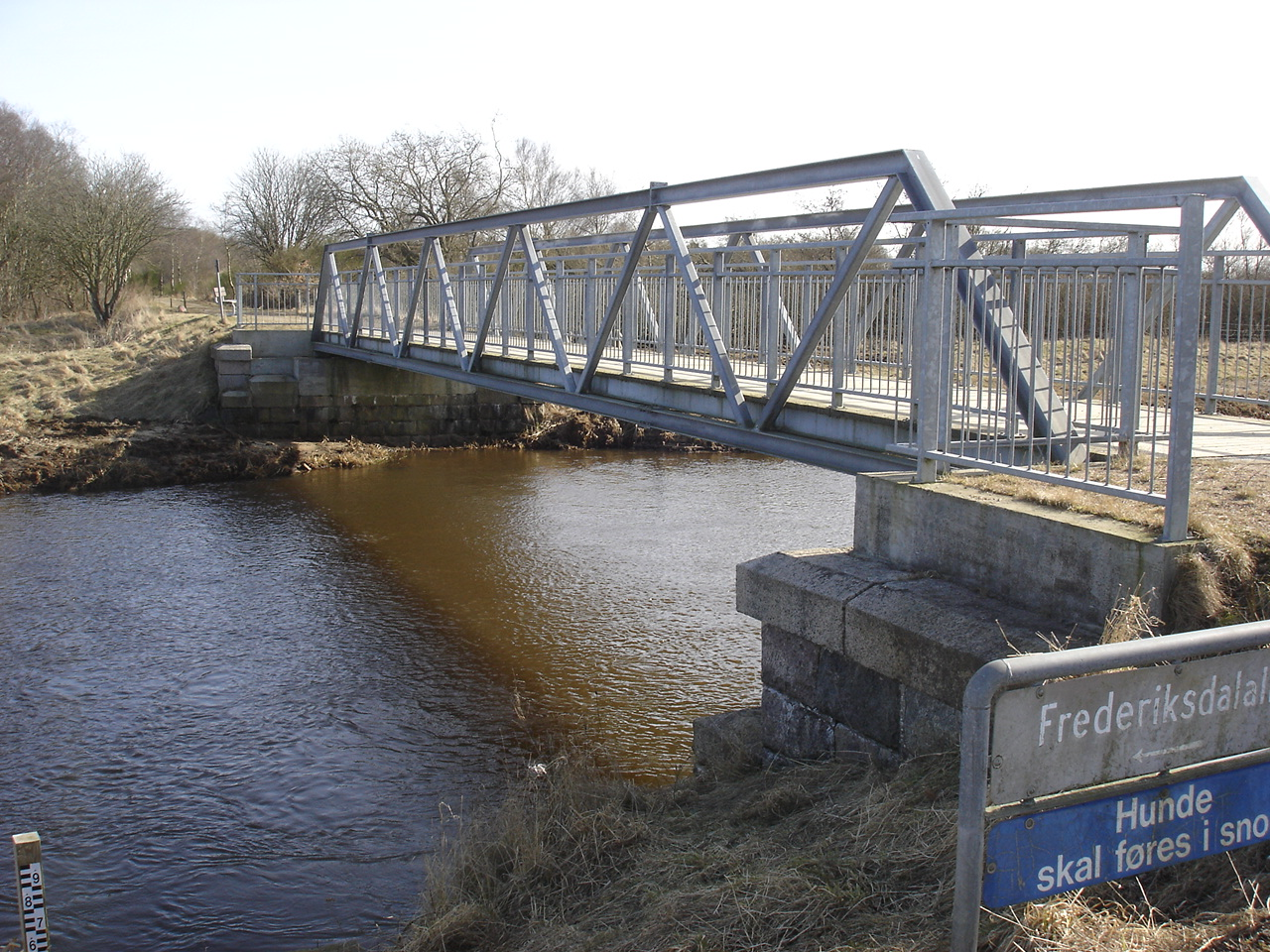
- Karup River

Location
- Country: Denmark
- Region: Jutland
- District: Central Denmark Region
- Municipality: Ikast-Brande, Herning, Viborg, Holstebro, Skive

Physical characteristics
- Source
  - location: The confluence of Skygge River and Bording River
- Mouth
  - location: Skive Fjord
  - elevation: 0 m (0 ft)
- Length: 78 km (48 mi)
- Basin size: 756 km^{2} (292 sq mi)

Karup River (Danish: Karup Å; pronounced [ˈkʰɑːɔp.ɔˀ]) is a river in central Jutland, Denmark. Prior to 1970, it formed the border between the Viborg and Ringkjøbing counties. Karup River is Denmark's sixth largest river. A 500-hectare area along the river, spanning 20 kilometers between Karup and Hagebro, was protected in 1964, and the entire stretch from Karup to Skive, a total of 1,008 hectares (including some tributaries), is now a European Union Special Area of Conservation.

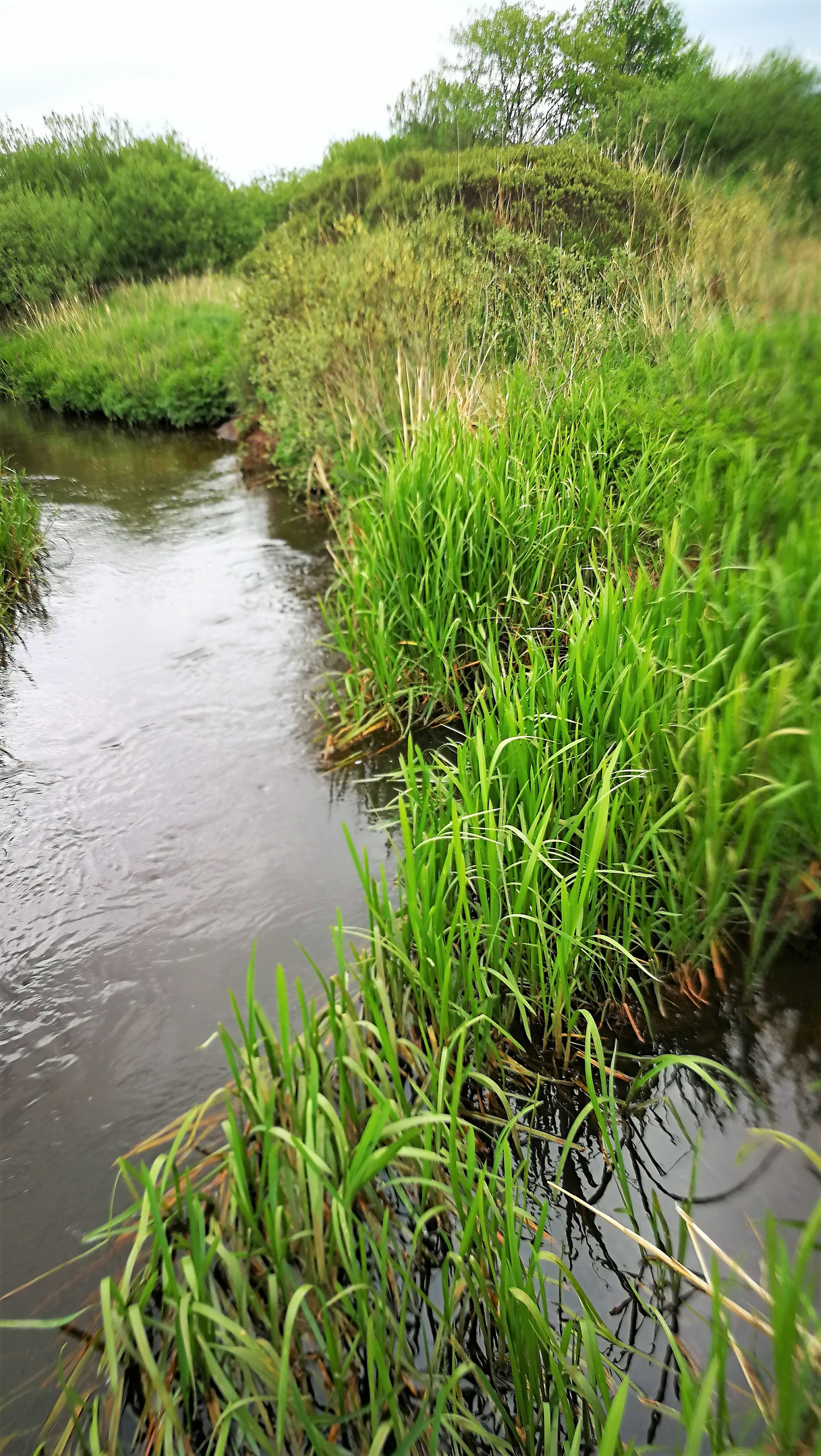
The confluence of Bording River with Skygge River at Skygge Bridge, northwest of Engesvang, forms Karup River.

== Geography ==
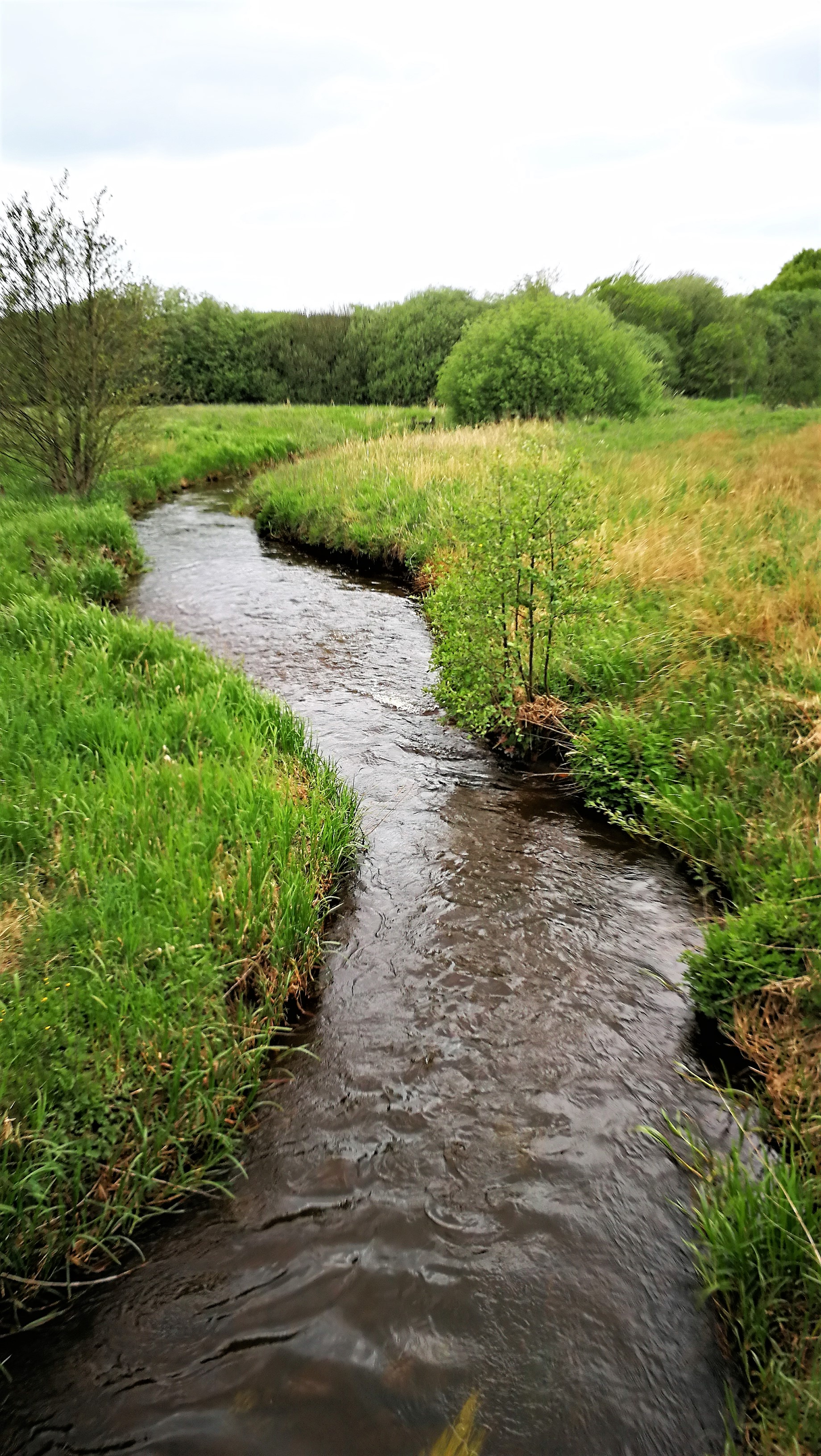
Karup River west of Skygge Bridge, shortly after the confluence of Skygge and Bording Rivers.

Karup River begins at Skygge, northwest of Engesvang, at the confluence of two streams: Bording River, which originates in Bording, and Skygge River, which has its source in Bølling Lake.

Further upstream, there are tributaries from Vallerbæk, which comes from Kompedal Plantage, and a couple of kilometers south of Karup, the river receives an eastern tributary from Haller River, which comes from the area around Hauge Sø near Grathe Heath south of Thorning. About 10 kilometers northwest of Karup, there is a tributary from Resen Brook at Resen, which, along with the slightly more northerly tributary Sejbæk, drains the Alheden heath and Kongenshus Mindepark. At Hagebro, there is a left tributary from Haderup River, which comes from the south.

The river continues northward. In Skive Ådal, the river is channeled, and on this stretch, it runs parallel to Koholm River, which drains Flyndersø and Stubbergaard Sø near Hjerl Hede. At Lundbro in the southwestern end of Skive, the two rivers merge and flow into Skive Fjord south of the city's harbor.

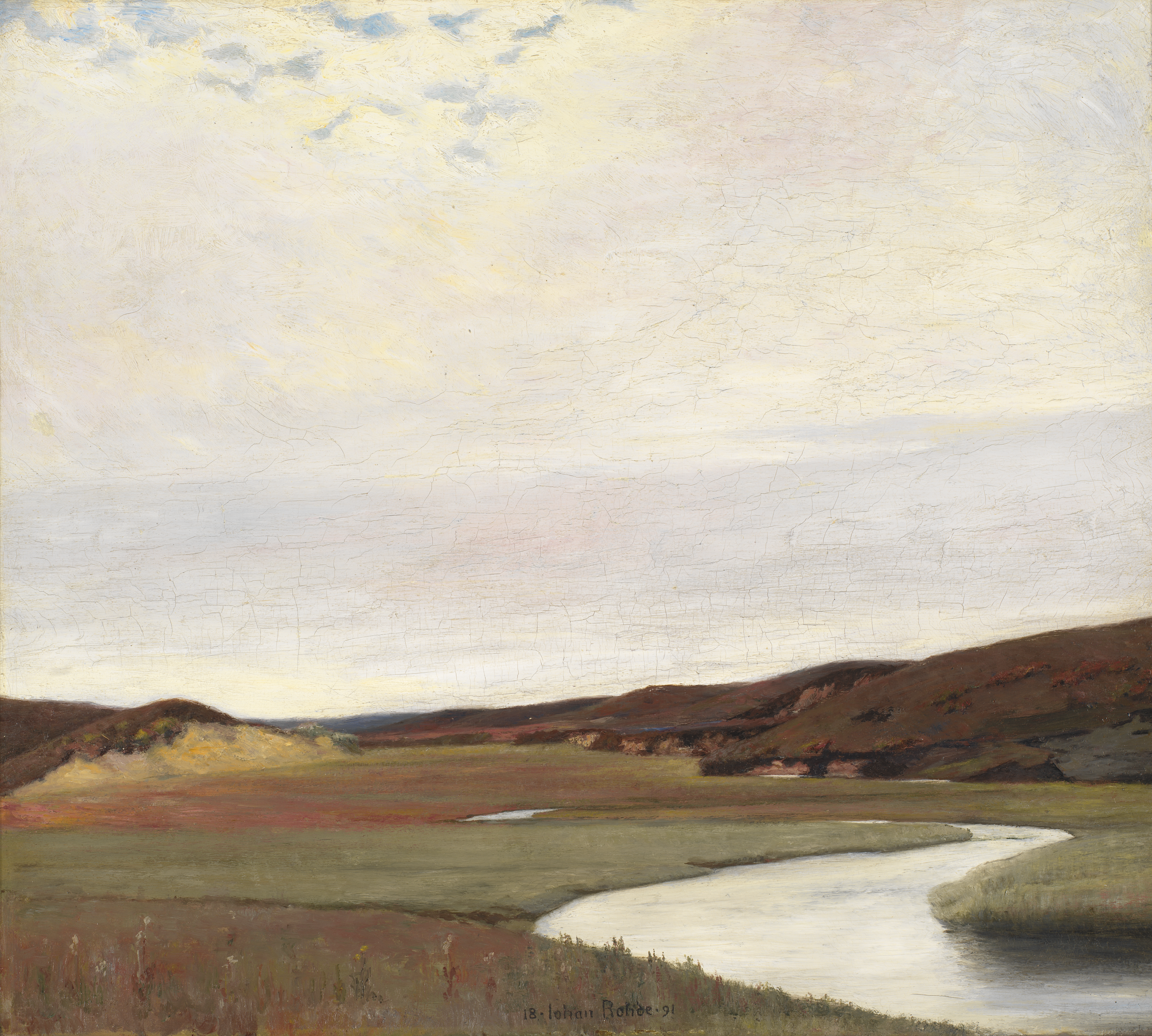
Johan Rohde, Sommerdag ved Karup Å (Summer's Day at Karup River), 1891, National Gallery of Denmark

== History ==
Previously, the northern part of the river (north of Hagebro Kro) was called Skive River, while the southern part was called Karup River. Danish poet Jeppe Aakjær, who grew up near the river, referred to the entire river as Karup River. Aakjær often wrote about the river and its significance for the people and nature of the region, and the poem Karup Aa (Karup River) from the 1901 poetry collection Fri Felt exemplifies this. The name Karup River is now widely used to refer to the entire river, although some maps still label the last section as Skive River.

The river valley was once an important grazing area for cattle. However, in the 1870s, a vast network of canals was constructed for watering the meadows to improve hay production. Karup River is home to a small population of the Eurasian otter and is also known for its excellent population of sea trout.
