= Urban district =

Geopolitical area headed by city

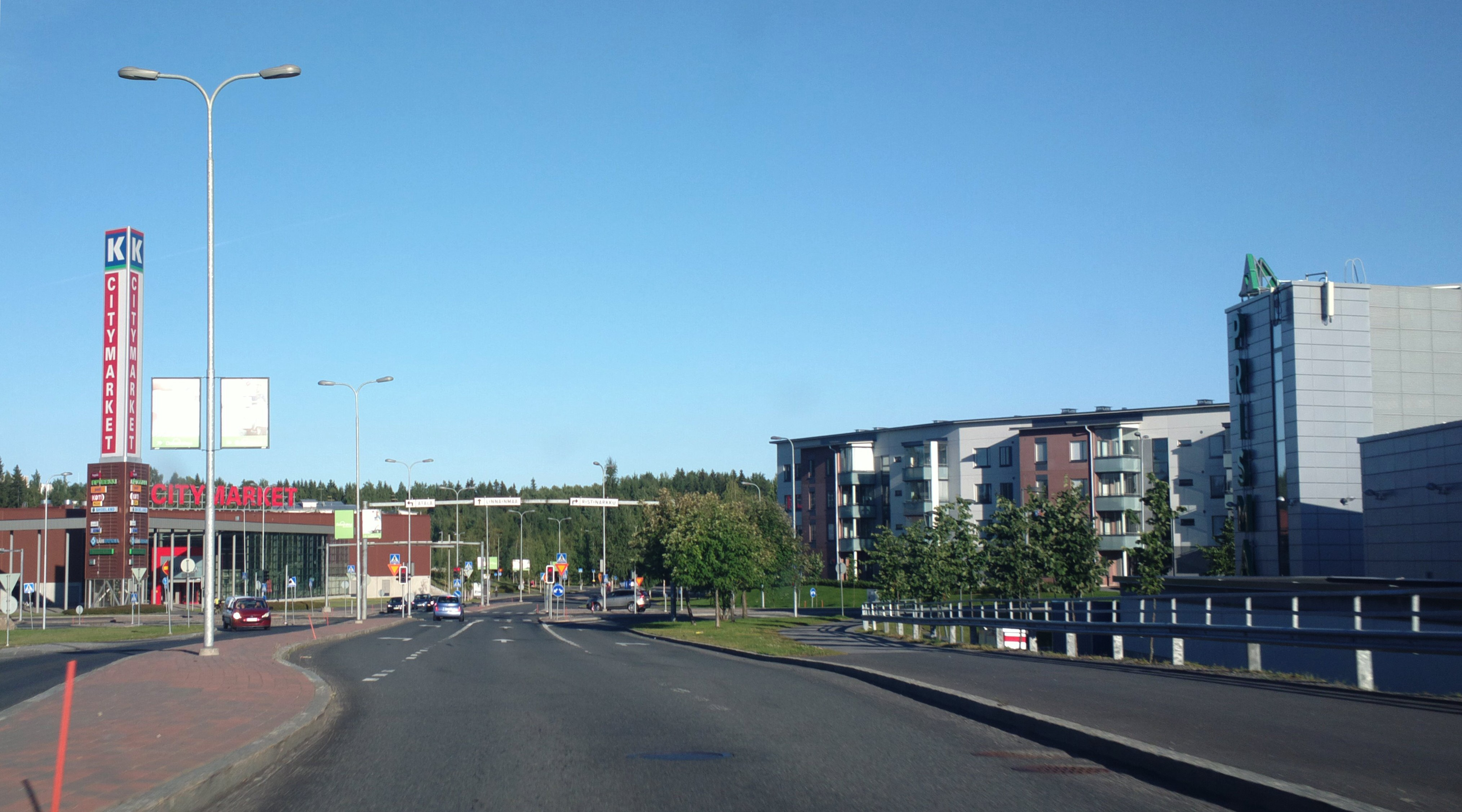
Linnainmaa, an urban district in the city of Tampere, Finland

An urban district is a division generally managed by a local government. It may also refer to a city district, district, urban area or quarter

Specific urban districts in some countries include:

- Urban districts of Denmark
- Districts of Germany
- Urban district (England and Wales) (historic)
- Urban and rural districts (Ireland) (historic)
- Urban districts of the Netherlands
- Districts of Sweden
- Urban districts of Ukraine
- List of urban districts of Vietnam
