= MASCOT Workwear =

Danish workwear company

Mascot International A/S
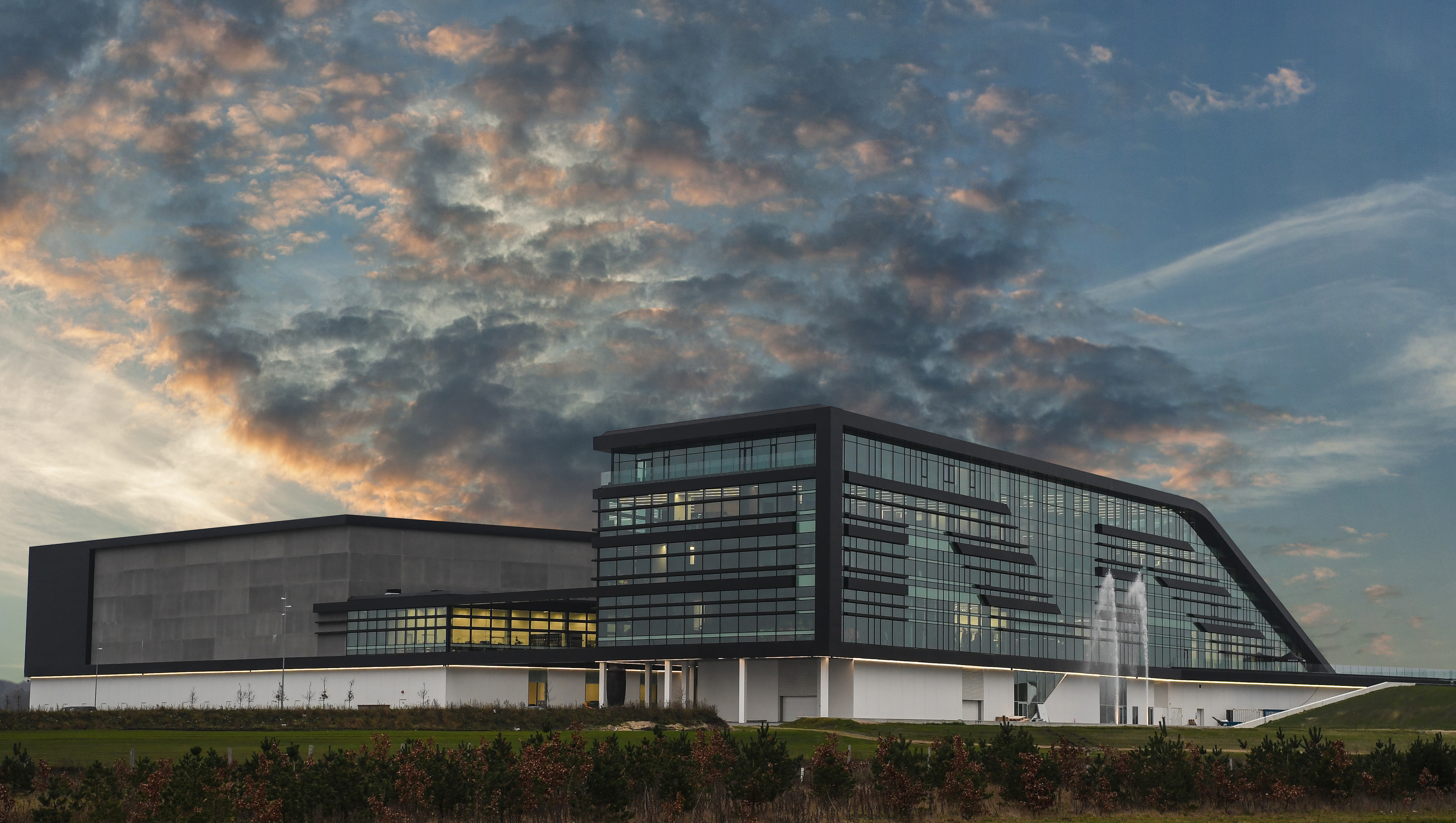
- MASCOT's headquarters in Denmark
- Founded: 1982
- Key people: Founder John Grosbøl, Managing Director Michael Grosbøl
- Products: Workwear, safety footwear, security workwear
- Number of employees: More than 4000 employees in Europe and in MASCOT's own factories in Vietnam and Laos.
- Website: mascotworkwear.com

Mascot International A/S is an international, family-run textile company with headquarters in Pårup, west of Silkeborg, Denmark. MASCOT designs, manufactures, and markets workwear, safety workwear and safety footwear. The company is 100% owned by the Grosbøl family.

== Board and the Supervisory Board ==
The Executive Board consists of five members, with Michael Grosbøl as the Managing Director. The Board consists of Chairman John Grosbøl, Tove Grosbøl, Michael Grosbøl, and Susie Grosbøl.

== History ==
MASCOT was founded by John Kjaergaard Grosbøl in 1982 under the name Scan Termo Konfektion Aps, selling winter clothes. The little bear in the logo symbolised durability and warmth, and soon MASCOT was best known as "the bear". In 1989, workwear was launched. The name became Mascot International A/S in 1995. From 1992 to 2002, Mascot increased its sales to $300 million. In 2002, Michael John Grosbøl took over the daily management of the company from his father John, who became Chairman of the Board of Mascot International.

In 2003, the company had revenue of DKK 260 million, and was the fourth largest producer of workwear in Europe. There were approximately 160 employees in Denmark, while the rest worked in sewing factories in the Far East.

In 2007, the company made nearly DKK 55 million, the largest earnings in MASCOT's history. In 2010, this result was beaten, as the profit before taxes was just over 55 million.

Company milestones in recent years include the establishment of its own SA8000 certified factory in Vietnam in 2008. and the purchase of a large piece of land in Pårup, Denmark, where they will build a new headquarters bringing together all of MASCOT's Danish activities. The new headquarters is expected to be completed in 2017. In 2018, MASCOT built its production facilities in Vietnam and Laos.

== Sponsorship ==
In January 2023, MASCOT entered into a sponsorship agreement with Shamrock Rovers as principal partner and front shirt sponsor of the men's team. In February of the same year, the company announced a partnership agreement with Alfa Romeo F1 Team, where the team's HQ staff at the Sauber Group’s factory in Hinwil, Switzerland, will wear MASCOT’s latest and most innovative product range, MASCOT CUSTOMIZED.
