= Agricultural lime =

Soil additive containing calcium carbonate and other ingredients

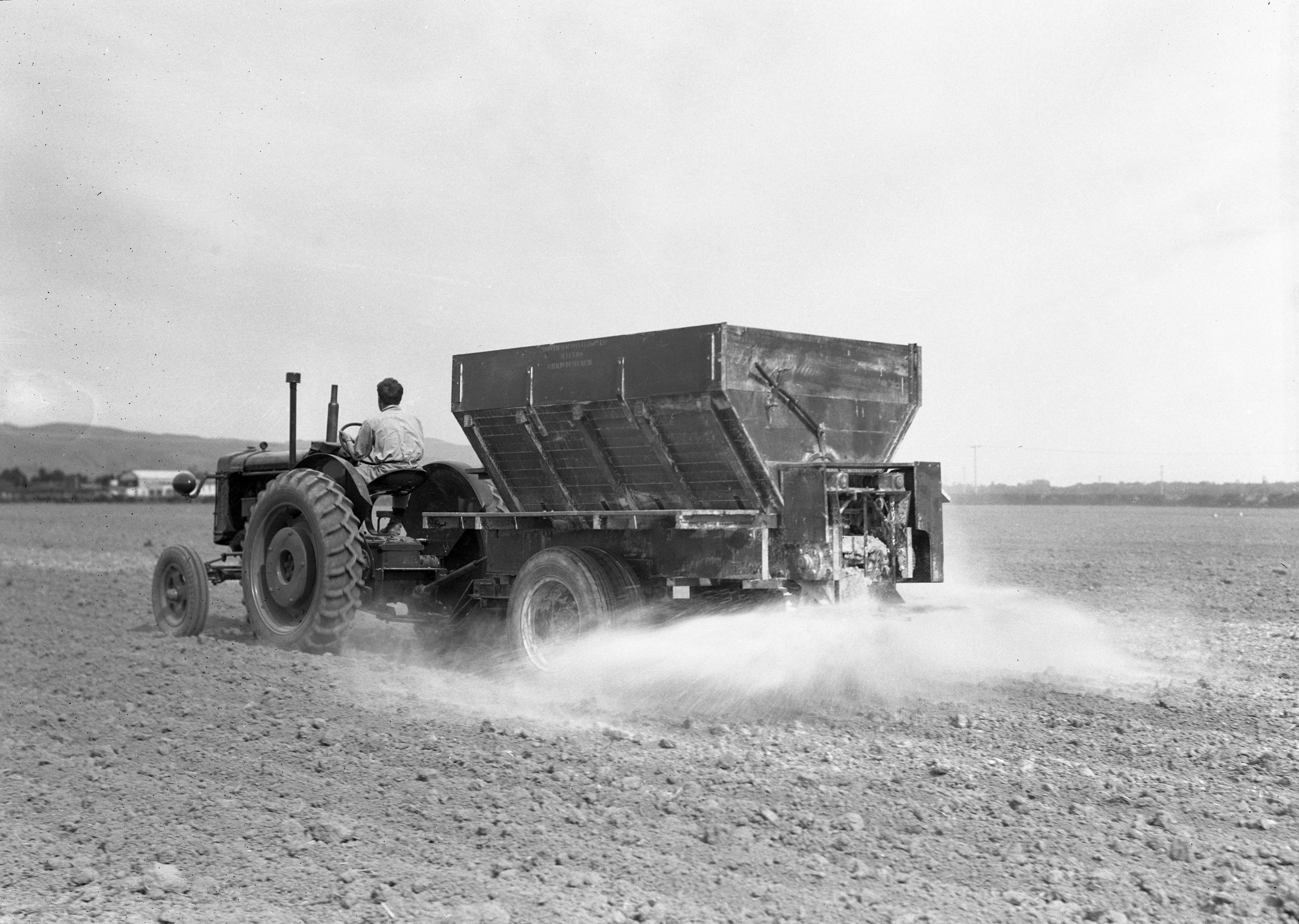
A bulk lime spreader operating at Canterbury Agricultural College, 1949

Agricultural lime, also called aglime, agricultural limestone, garden lime or liming, is a soil additive made from pulverized limestone or chalk. The primary active component is calcium carbonate. Additional chemicals vary depending on the mineral source and may include calcium oxide. Unlike the types of lime called quicklime (calcium oxide) and slaked lime (calcium hydroxide), powdered limestone does not require lime burning in a lime kiln; it only requires milling.

All of these types of lime are sometimes used as soil conditioners, with a common theme of providing a base to correct acidity, but lime for farm fields today is often crushed limestone. Historically, liming of farm fields in centuries past was often done with burnt lime; the difference is at least partially explained by the fact that affordable mass-production-scale fine milling of stone and ore relies on technologies developed since the mid-19th century.

== Use ==
Some effects of agricultural lime on soil are:

- it increases the pH of acidic soil, reducing soil acidity and increasing alkalinity
- it provides a source of calcium for plants
- it improves water penetration for acidic soils
- it improves the uptake of major plant nutrients (nitrogen, phosphorus, and potassium) of plants growing on acid soils.

Other forms of lime have common applications in agriculture and gardening, including dolomitic lime and hydrated lime. Dolomitic lime may be used as a soil input to provide similar effects as agricultural lime, while supplying magnesium in addition to calcium. In livestock farming, hydrated lime can be used as a disinfectant measure, producing a dry and alkaline environment in which bacteria do not readily multiply. In horticultural farming it can be used as an insect repellent without causing harm to the pest or plant.

Spinner-style lime spreaders are generally used to spread agricultural lime on fields.

Agricultural lime is injected into coal burners at power plants to reduce the pollutants such as NO_{2} and SO_{2} from the emissions.

== Benefits ==
Lime can improve crop yield and the root system of plants and grass where soils are acidic. It does this by making the soil more basic, allowing the plants to absorb more nutrients. Lime is not a fertilizer but can be used in combination with fertilizers. Soils become acidic in several ways. Locations that have high rainfall levels become acidic through leaching. Land used for crop and livestock purposes loses minerals over time by crop removal and becomes acidic. The application of modern chemical fertilizers is a major contributor to soil acid by the process in which the plant nutrients react in the soil.

Aglime can benefit soils where the land is used for breeding and raising foraging animals. Bone growth is key to a young animal's development, and bones are composed primarily of calcium and phosphorus. Young mammals get their needed calcium through milk, which has calcium as one of its major components. Dairymen frequently apply aglime because it increases milk production.

The best way to determine if the soil is acidic or deficient in calcium or magnesium is with a soil test which a university with an agricultural education department can provide at low cost. Farmers typically become interested in soil testing when they notice a decrease in crop response to applied fertilizer. "Corrected lime potential" is used in soil testing laboratories to indicate whether lime is required.

== Quality ==
The quality of agricultural limestone is determined by the chemical makeup of the limestone and how finely the stone is ground. To aid the farmer in determining the relative value of competing agricultural liming materials, the agricultural extension services of several universities use two rating systems. Calcium Carbonate Equivalent (CCE) and the Effective Calcium Carbonate Equivalent (ECCE) give a numeric value to the effectiveness of different liming materials.

The CCE compares the chemistry of a particular quarry's stone with the neutralizing power of pure calcium carbonate. Because each molecule of magnesium carbonate is lighter than calcium carbonate, limestones containing magnesium carbonate (dolomite) can have a CCE greater than 100 percent.

Because the acids in soil are relatively weak, agricultural limestones must be ground to a small particle size to be effective. The extension service of different states rate the effectiveness of stone size particles slightly differently. They all agree, however, that the smaller the particle size the more effective the stone is at reacting in the soil. Measuring the size of particles is based on the size of a mesh that the limestone would pass through. The mesh size is the number of wires per inch. Stone retained on an 8 mesh will be about the size of BB pellets. Material passing a 60 mesh screen will have the appearance of face powder. Particles larger than 8 mesh are of little or no value, particles between 8 mesh and 60 mesh are somewhat effective, and particles smaller than 60 mesh are 100 percent effective.

By combining the CCE and its particle size, the Effective Calcium Carbonate Equivalent (ECCE) is determined. The ECCE is percentage comparison of a particular agricultural limestone with pure calcium carbonate with all particles smaller than 60 mesh. Typically the aglime materials in commercial use will have ECCE ranging from 45 percent to 110 percent.

== Brazil's case ==
Brazil's vast inland cerrado region was regarded as unfit for farming before the 1960s because the soil was too acidic and poor in nutrients, according to Nobel Peace Prize winner Norman Borlaug, an American plant scientist referred to as the father of the Green Revolution. However, from the 1960s, vast quantities of lime (pulverised chalk or limestone) were poured into the soil to reduce acidity. The effort continued, and in the late 1990s, between 14 million and 16 million tonnes of lime were spread on Brazilian fields each year. The quantity rose to 25 million tonnes in 2003 and 2004, equalling around five tonnes of lime per hectare. As a result, Brazil has become the world's second biggest soybean exporter, and thanks to the boom in animal feed production, Brazil is now the biggest exporter of beef and poultry in the world.

== Effect on prehistoric mobility studies ==
A 2019 study demonstrated that agricultural lime affects strontium-based mobility studies, which attempt to identify where individual prehistoric people lived. Agricultural lime has a significant effect in areas with calcium-poor soils. In a systematic study of the Karup River in Denmark, more than half of the strontium in the river's catchment was found to come from runoff of agricultural lime and not from the surrounding natural environment. Such introduction of agricultural lime has resulted in researchers wrongly concluding that certain prehistoric individuals originated far abroad from their burial sites, because strontium isotopic results measured in their remains and personal effects were compared to burial sites contaminated by agricultural lime.

== See also ==
- Marl
- Liming (soil)
