= Birk Centerpark railway halt =

Railway halt in Herning, Denmark

Birk Centerpark
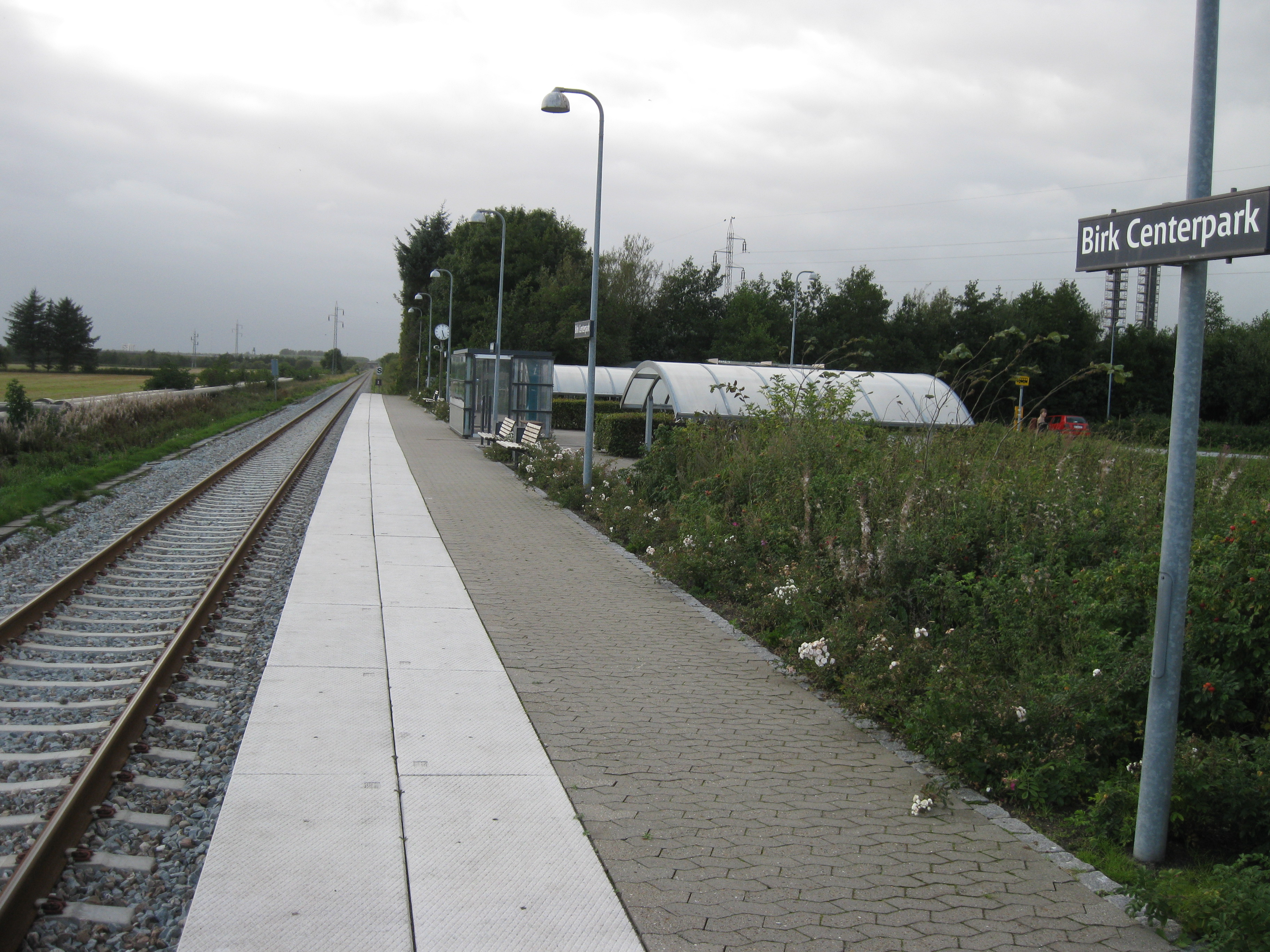
- Birk Centerpark railway halt in 2012

General information
- Location: Birk Centerpark 42; 7400 Herning; Herning Municipality; Denmark
- Coordinates: 56°07′32″N 9°01′44″E
- Elevation: 47.7 metres (156 ft)
- Owner: DSB (station infrastructure); Banedanmark (rail infrastructure)
- Line: Skanderborg–Skjern
- Platforms: 1
- Tracks: 1
- Train operators: GoCollective

Other information
- Website: Official website

History
- Opened: 1997

Services
Preceding station	GoCollective	Following station
Herning towards Skjern	Aarhus–Skjern Regional train	Hammerum towards Aarhus Central
Location

Birk Centerpark railway halt is a railway halt serving the district of Birk in the eastern part of the city of Herning in Central Jutland, Denmark. The halt provides access to nearby businesses, educational institutions, and a student residential area, making it a key local transit point for the eastern part of Herning.

Birk Centerpark railway halt is situated on the Skanderborg–Skjern line. It opened in 1997. The halt is served by direct regional trains to Aarhus, Skjern and Struer, operated by GoCollective.

== See also ==
- List of railway stations in Denmark
