= Listed buildings in Ikast-Brande Municipality =

This is a list of listed buildings in Ikast-Brande Municipality, Denmark.

== The list ==
Listing name	Image	Location	Description	Year built	Ref
Branduhre Mølle		Tarpvej 27, 7330 Brande	1840	Windmill from 1840	Ref
Højris		Remmevej 18, 7430 Ikast		House from the late 18th century	Ref
