= Ikast railway station =

Railway station in Jutland, Denmark

Ikast
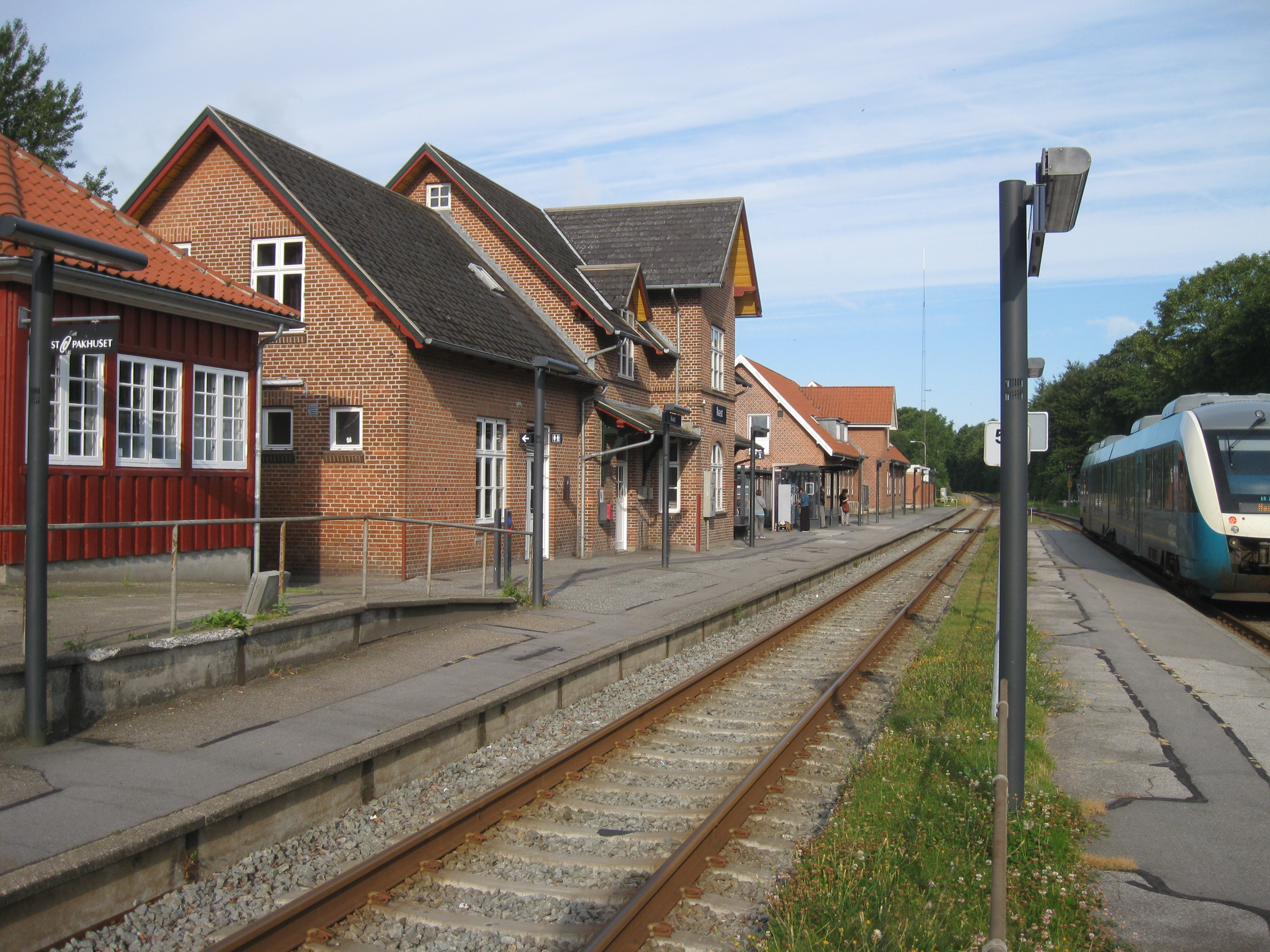
- Ikast Station in 2015

General information
- Location: Lille Torv 3; 7430 Ikast; Ikast-Brande Municipality; Denmark
- Coordinates: 56°08′41″N 9°9′19″E
- Elevation: 68.1 metres (223 ft)
- Owner: DSB (station infrastructure); Banedanmark (rail infrastructure)
- Line: Skanderborg–Skjern line
- Platforms: 2
- Tracks: 2
- Train operators: GoCollective

Construction
- Architect: Niels Peder Christian Holsøe

Other information
- Station code: Ik
- Website: Official website

History
- Opened: 28 August 1877

Services
Preceding station	GoCollective	Following station
Hammerum towards Skjern	Aarhus–Skjern Regional train	Bording towards Aarhus Central
Location

Ikast station is a railway station serving the railway town of Ikast east of the city of Herning in Jutland, Denmark.

Ikast station is located on the Skanderborg–Skjern line. The station opened in 1877. It offers direct regional train services to Aarhus, Skjern and Struer operated by GoCollective.

== Architecture ==
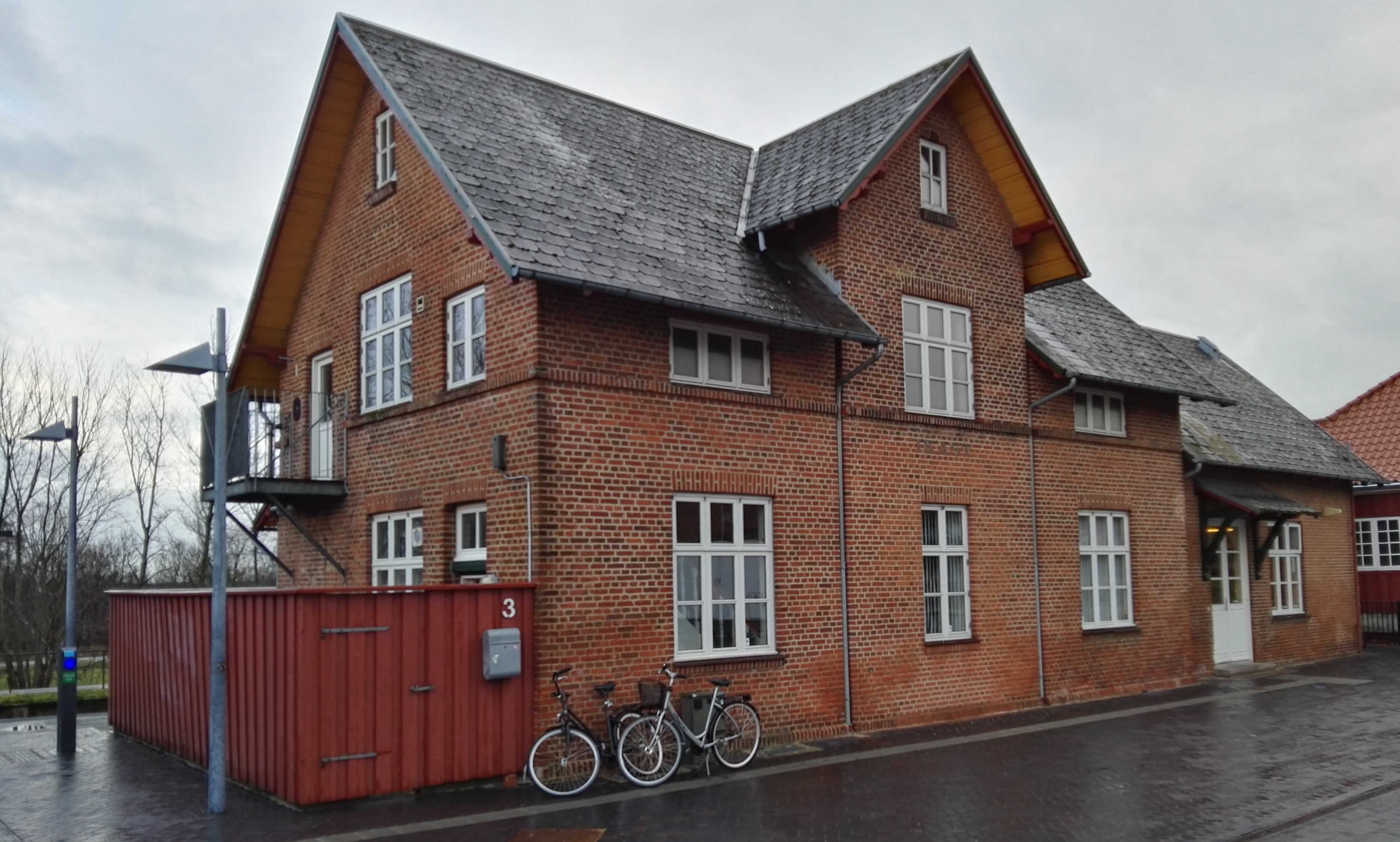
Street facade of Ikast station in 2019.

The station building from 1877 was designed by the Danish architect Niels Peder Christian Holsøe (1826–1895), known for the numerous railway stations he designed across Denmark in his capacity of head architect of the Danish State Railways.

== See also ==
- List of railway stations in Denmark
- Rail transport in Denmark
- History of rail transport in Denmark
- Transport in Denmark
