= Skive Stadium =

Danish association football stadium

Coordinates: 56°34′5.3″N 9°2′15.8″E

Skive Stadion Hancock Arena
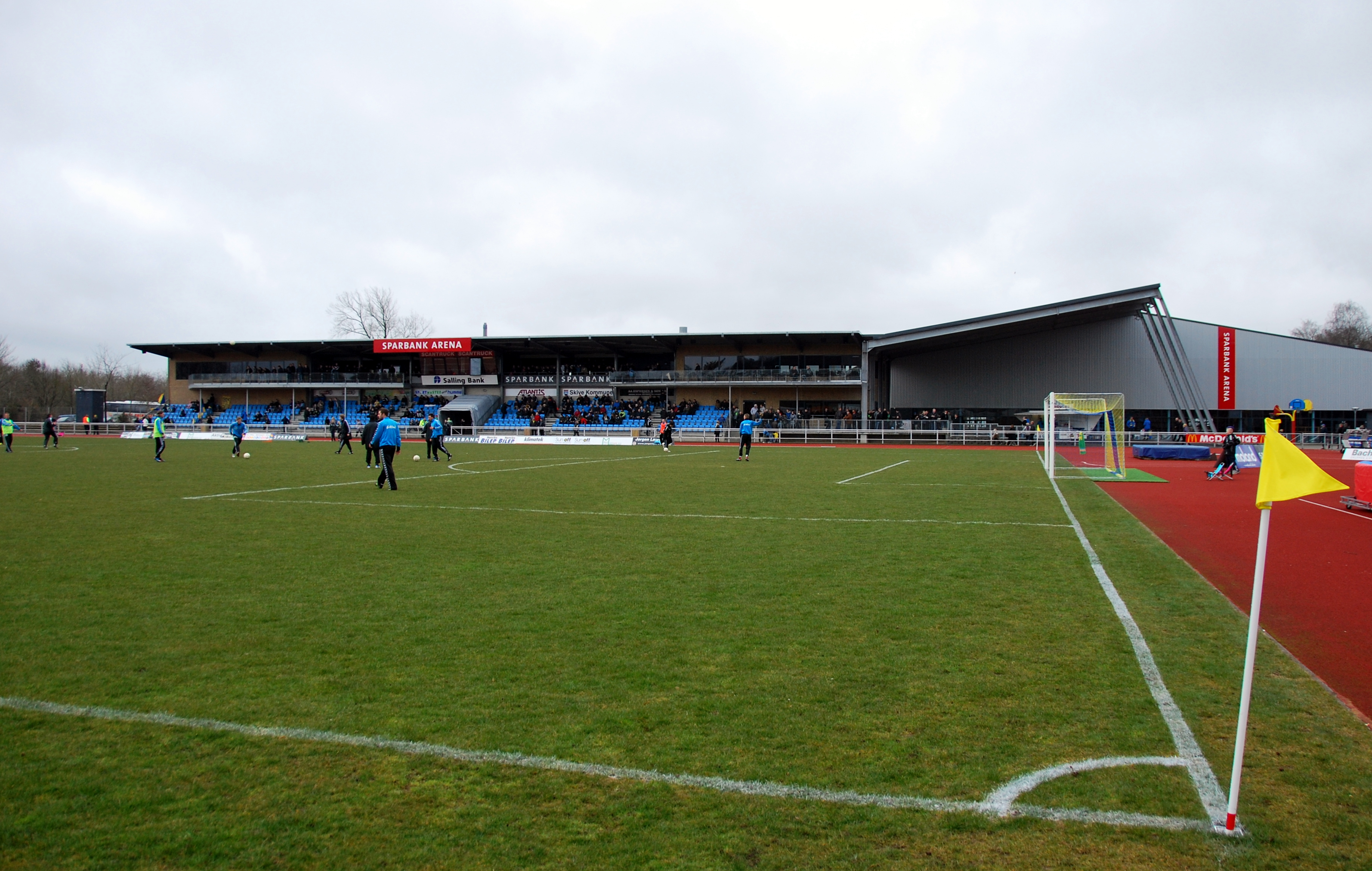
- View of the stadium during a match in April 2012
- Interactive map of Skive Stadion; Hancock Arena
- Full name: Skive Stadium
- Former names: Skive Stadion (1944-present); Sparbank Arena (2010–2012); Spar Nord Arena (2012–2018); SIK Arena (2018); Hancock Arena (2018–present)
- Location: Engvej 19; 7800 Skive
- Owner: Skive Municipality
- Capacity: 6,000 (523 seatings)
- Surface: Natural grass
- Record attendance: 10,000 (Skive IK vs Viborg FF, 19 May 1955)
- Field size: 105 by 68 metres (114.8 yd × 74.4 yd)

Construction
- Groundbreaking: May 1941
- Built: 1941–1944
- Opened: 5 June 1944; 82 years ago
- Renovated: 1998–1999, 2002–2003, 2009 and 2010
- Expanded: 1965–1966
- Cost: DKK 130,000 (1944); DKK 10 million (1998–1999); DKK 2.6 million (2017)
- Main contractor: Kaj Ove Madsen A/S (2002-2003)

Tenants
- Skive IK (1944–1997; 2003–present); Skive AM (1977–present); Arbejdernes IF (1944–1946)

Skive Stadium (Danish: Skive Stadion) is an athletics- and association football stadium located in Skive, Denmark, owned and operated by Skive Municipality. It is currently used mostly for association football matches and is the home stadium of Skive Idrætsklub (association football) and Skive Atletik- og Motionsklub (athletics). The stadium is part of a sport center, which since 2007 has also consisted of a multi-purpose hall named Spar Nord Arena, while the stadium itself includes IAAF certified athletics and sports facilities such as six round lanes, eight straight lanes, starting blocks, electronic timing, two tracks for the long jump and triple jump, pole vault and three throw cages surrounding an association football field. The ground has a lighting installation with a light intensity of 500 lux and have been approved for televised Danish 1st Division matches by the Danish FA. Apart from hosting matches for the second highest football league, the stadium has also staged two men's youth friendlies and two European women's youth qualification games, one for the Danish national youth team. It has been known as Hancock Arena for sponsorship reasons since July 2018 and have previously been referred to as Sparbank Arena (2010–2012), Spar Nord Arena (2012–2018) and SIK Arena (2018).

== History ==
The construction of the stadium at Engvej broke ground in May 1941, with the last details coming into place in the spring of 1943, and the new stadium was finished in 1944 at a total cost of DKK 130,000. As part of the agreement between Skive IK and Skive Municipality, a new club house was built at the ground at a cost of DKK 12,000 and the club officially moved to Engvej in the spring of 1944. The stadium, with a total area of 9.5 barrels of land located at the meadow referred as Rosens Eng next to Karup River, consisted of an exhibition field with athletics courses, two training fields and four tennis courts. In the years leading up to the construction of the stadium, the meadow had already been filled up by the municipality as relief work for the unemployed. The inauguration of the stadium at Engvej took place on 5 June 1944 (Constitution Day) with a programme consisting of a large athletics event with participation of many of the country's strongest athletes and an association football match in front of nearly 4,000 spectators. Skive IK, participating in the 1943–44 JBU's Mesterskabsrække, lost their association football match against the best placed Jutlandish league team in the 1943–44 season, Aarhus GF. Arbejdernes Idrætsforening (AIF), which was the competing sports team in the city, had their own inauguration of the stadium on 18 June 1944 with music, singing and association football, and their first team in the JBU's Mellemrække played an exhibition match against the local rivals Holstebro BK from the JBU's Mesterskabsrække.

The City Council of Skive made a unanimous decision on 12 June 1944 to prohibit the presence of non-paying spectators at the north lying hillside, with the residence of the Skive Museum, during association football matches. Proposed by the then Street and Road Committee, the ban was meant to discourage potential free riders from viewing the matches from outside that stadium's gates, which could cost revenue for Skive IK and Skive Municipality. However, the local police have never enforced the ban nor spend resources on it, which have not had any significant impact. In the spring of 1945, the German occupying forces seizes the stadium facilities and on 8 May 1945 a large parade was held by the Danish resistance movement. Although the construction of a covered spectator stand had to be abandoned due to the stringent rationing of building material during World War II, it was finally built starting from the summer of 1965 to spring 1966 using voluntary labor and with partial financial support from Skive Municipality for the building materials, and was attached to Skive IK's new club member's house next to the football field — the house was inaugurated on 28 March 1966.

The stadium holds 10,000 people of which 523 are seated at the covered grandstand in the south west side. The stadium's record attendance was recorded on 19 May 1955 (Ascension Day), when sold-out stadium crowd of nearly 10,000 spectators watched the last decisive league match in the 1954–55 Jutland Series between the two highest placed teams in the northern division, Skive IK and local rivals Viborg FF, competing for the division title and hence a spot in the 1954–55 Jutland Championship Final and qualification for the 1954–55 Kvalifikationsturneringen (popularly known as the Danish 4th Division). The level 4 league match, that Viborg FF won 3–2 in windy rain, is reportedly the largest match attendance to a lower ranking Danish league game, outside of the top three divisional structure.

Large renovations and expansions to the stadium began in 1998. At that point, club members referred to the 55 years old ground as the most outdated division stadium in Denmark. As a consequence of the first phase, that involved the running tracks for the athletes having synthetic coating installed by 1999 and hence upgrading them to international standards, Skive IK was forced to relocate their professional association football home matches to Egeris Idrætsanlæg (more specifically Bane 1) in the south part of the city — the team played a last game at the stadium, before the renovations commenced, against Skovshoved IF in the fall of 1997 as part of their 1997–98 Danish 2nd Division campaign. The club's professional senior team played at their temporary ground until the reconstruction was completed in 2003, while Skive AM was the only club to use the stadium facilities after the completion of phase one. After a 5.5 year displacement period, Skive IK inaugurated the renovated stadium on 11 May 2003 with a derby against Holstebro BK in front of 1,720 spectators as part of a larger celebration program that included speeches, cycling and athletics competitions. The first phase had cost Skive Municipality DKK 10 million, which delayed the second phase of the project due to lack of funds. The task of completing phase two was handed to a local Skive contractor, Kaj Ove Madsen A/S. The second phase involved renovations to the buildings by 2003, resulting in a two-story extension of the building's wings totaling 190 m^{2}, 520 covered seatings and other facilities at the grandstand, a more contemporary scoreboard and a new grass blanket on the football field was laid. The existing changing rooms were renovated with additional changing rooms installed for the referees. Changes also included facilities such as an exercise room, public toilets, a cafeteria with an extended terrace, a kitchen at the building's ground floor, while the first floor got VIP rooms for sponsors, press and meetings, a speakerbox, and rooms for the local athletics and cycling clubs, Skive AM and Skive Cykelklub. Plankings were erected around the stadium as part of the modernisations to the stadium, with the support of Skive IK's then chairman, to prevent matches being viewed from Engvej, and the Skive Committee on Culture and Industry took the initiative to beautify the planking with climbing plants.

The running tracks were renovated again in 2009 due to wear and tear together with the buildings in 2010, and included the installation of a balcony at the grandstand and, due to security reasons, a designated area for the away fans at association football matches and better sponsor facilities. On 7 and 10 April 2016, the stadium hosted two 2016 UEFA Women's Under-19 Championship qualification games, and have previously staged two men's friendlies for the Danish national youth teams in 1961 and 2015. An upgrade of the existing floodlights of 150 lux to 500 lux was done in the late 2000s to better support the minimum requirements of 1000 lux set forward for evening TV-transmissions at level 2.

New demands for under-soil heating at all professional matches in the Danish 1st Division were implemented beginning with the 2017/18 season, and Skive IK could no longer rely on a several years long dispensation from the Danish FA. Hence, in the summer of 2017 Skive Municipality decided to invest DKK 2.6 million in installing a total of 25 kilometers of pipes under the municipal owned facility's football field as part of the new heating system provided by Danjord. In the years leading up to 2010, both Skive IK Elite A/S and Skive AM had been paying Skive Municipality an annual rent of DKK 100,000 and in the years leading up to 2019, SIK Elite were paying DKK 318,999 in annual rent for the usage of Skive Stadium, but the latest investments to the ground heating and recent overpayments from Skive IK meant an adjustment of the annual rent down to DKK 295,000 not including the payment for using the new heating system. The watering system at the stadium, installed in the summer of 2010, makes use of the nearby river, Karup River, which lowers the cost of water to a minimum.

== Name, sponsorships and logos ==
On 8 September 2009, the Finance Committee of Skive Municipality approved the sale of the rights to naming sponsorships at Skive Stadium to Skive IK Elite A/S for DKK 25,000 for four years in addition to having the rights to sell banner ads at Skive Stadium. On 1 July 2010 the regional bank, Sparbank, obtained the naming rights for the stadium, renaming it Sparbank Arena, creating matching names with the indoor athletics hall next to the stadium, that was constructed in 2007. When the regional Skive-based bank merged with the Aalborg-based bank Spar Nord Bank in the fall of 2012, the sponsorship agreement was continued in the new financial constellation, with the stadium name being changed to Spar Nord Arena, beginning 18 November 2012. The bank announced a withdrawal from its main sponsorship of Skive IK Elite A/S and its naming rights to the stadium in the fall of 2017, which was made public in February 2018, but would continue having the naming rights for the stadium in 2018 until a new sponsor was found. Due to uncertainty surrounding the withdrawal, for a short period in March 2018, the stadium was hence temporarily referred to as SIK Arena. On 1 July 2018, Skive Stadium officially changed its name to Hancock Arena, when a sponsorship deal was reached between the local brewery Hancock Bryggerierne A/S and SIK Elite, that is set to expire on 1 January 2022. At FIFA and UEFA matches, it is still known under its original name, Skive Stadium, due to sponsorship restrictions.

Logos used for the naming rights agreements of the stadium:

Sparbank Arena
(2010–2012)
Sponsor: Sparbank

Spar Nord Arena
(2012–2018)
Sponsor: Spar Nord Bank

Hancock Arena
(2018–present)
Sponsor: Hancock Brewery
