= Pårup =

- Village
- Location in Central Denmark Region Pårup (Denmark)
- Coordinates: 56°8′13″N 9°20′57″E
- Country: Denmark
- Region: Central Denmark (Midtjylland)
- Municipality: Ikast-Brande

Population (2026)
  - Total: 235
- Postal code: DK-7442 Engesvang

Pårup is a small village, with a population of 235 (1 January 2026), in Ikast-Brande Municipality, Central Denmark Region in Denmark. It is located between Silkeborg and Ikast 3 km south of Engesvang.

Pårup Kro (Pårup Inn) is located in the village.
