= Hammerum railway station =

Railway station in Jutland, Denmark

Hammerum
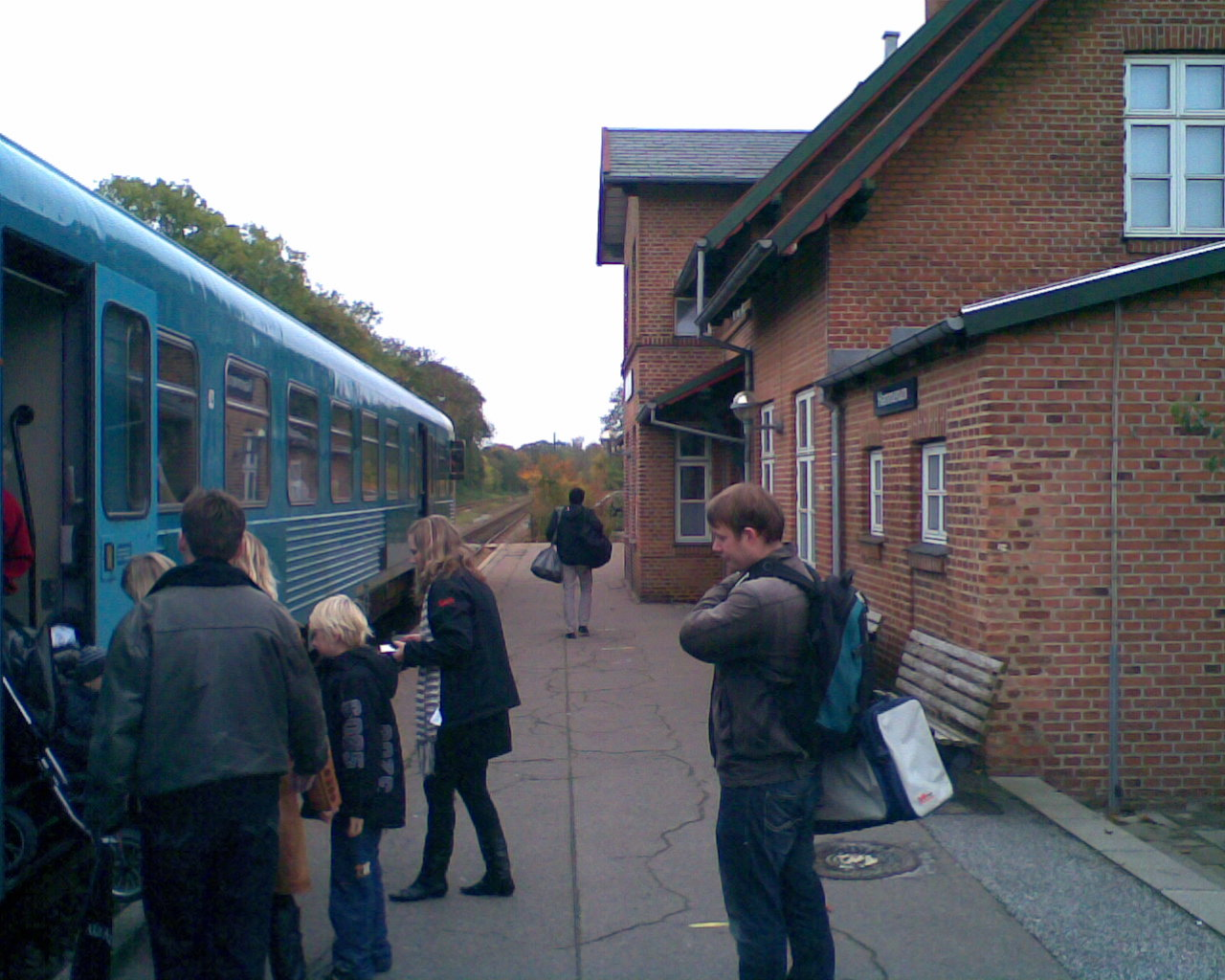
- Hammerum Station in 2008

General information
- Location: Jernbanegade 7; 7400 Herning; Herning Municipality; Denmark
- Coordinates: 56°07′54″N 9°03′47″E
- Elevation: 57.2 metres (188 ft)
- Owner: DSB (station infrastructure); Banedanmark (rail infrastructure)
- Line: Skanderborg–Skjern line
- Platforms: 1
- Tracks: 1
- Train operators: GoCollective

History
- Opened: 28 August 1877

Services
Preceding station	GoCollective	Following station
Birk Centerpark towards Skjern	Aarhus–Skjern Regional train	Ikast towards Aarhus Central
Location

Hammerum station is a railway station serving the railway town of Hammerum east of the city of Herning in Jutland, Denmark.

Hammerum station is located on the Skanderborg–Skjern railway line. The station opened in 1877. It offers direct regional train services to Aarhus, Skjern and Struer operated by the public transport company GoCollective.

== See also ==
- List of railway stations in Denmark
