= Engesvang railway station =

Railway station in Jutland, Denmark

Engesvang
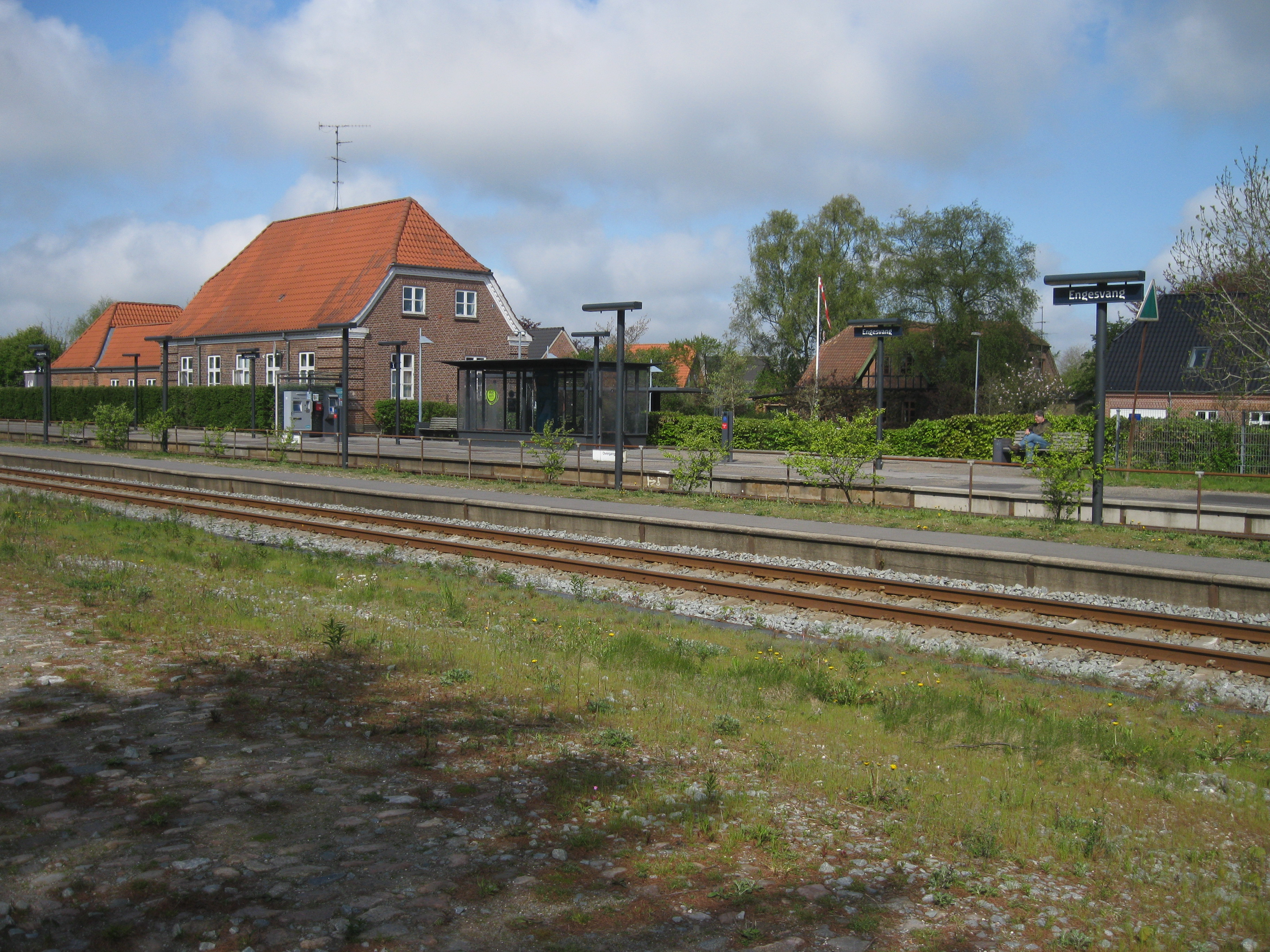
- Engesvang Station in 2015

General information
- Location: Jernbanegade 18; 7442 Engesvang; Ikast-Brande Municipality; Denmark
- Coordinates: 56°10′05″N 9°21′06″E
- Elevation: 83.4 metres (274 ft)
- Owner: DSB (station infrastructure); Banedanmark (rail infrastructure)
- Line: Skanderborg–Skjern line
- Platforms: 2
- Tracks: 2
- Train operators: GoCollective

History
- Opened: 28 August 1877

Services
Preceding station	GoCollective	Following station
Bording towards Skjern	Aarhus–Skjern Regional train	Silkeborg towards Aarhus Central
Location

Engesvang station is a railway station serving the railway town of Engesvang in Central Jutland, Denmark. The station is situated in the central part of the town, close to where the railway line crosses the road between Viborg and Vejle.

Engesvang station is located on the Skanderborg–Skjern line. The station opened in 1877. It offers direct regional train services to Aarhus, Skjern and Struer operated by operated by the private public transport company GoCollective.

== See also ==
- List of railway stations in Denmark
- Rail transport in Denmark
