= Ejstrupholm =

- Town
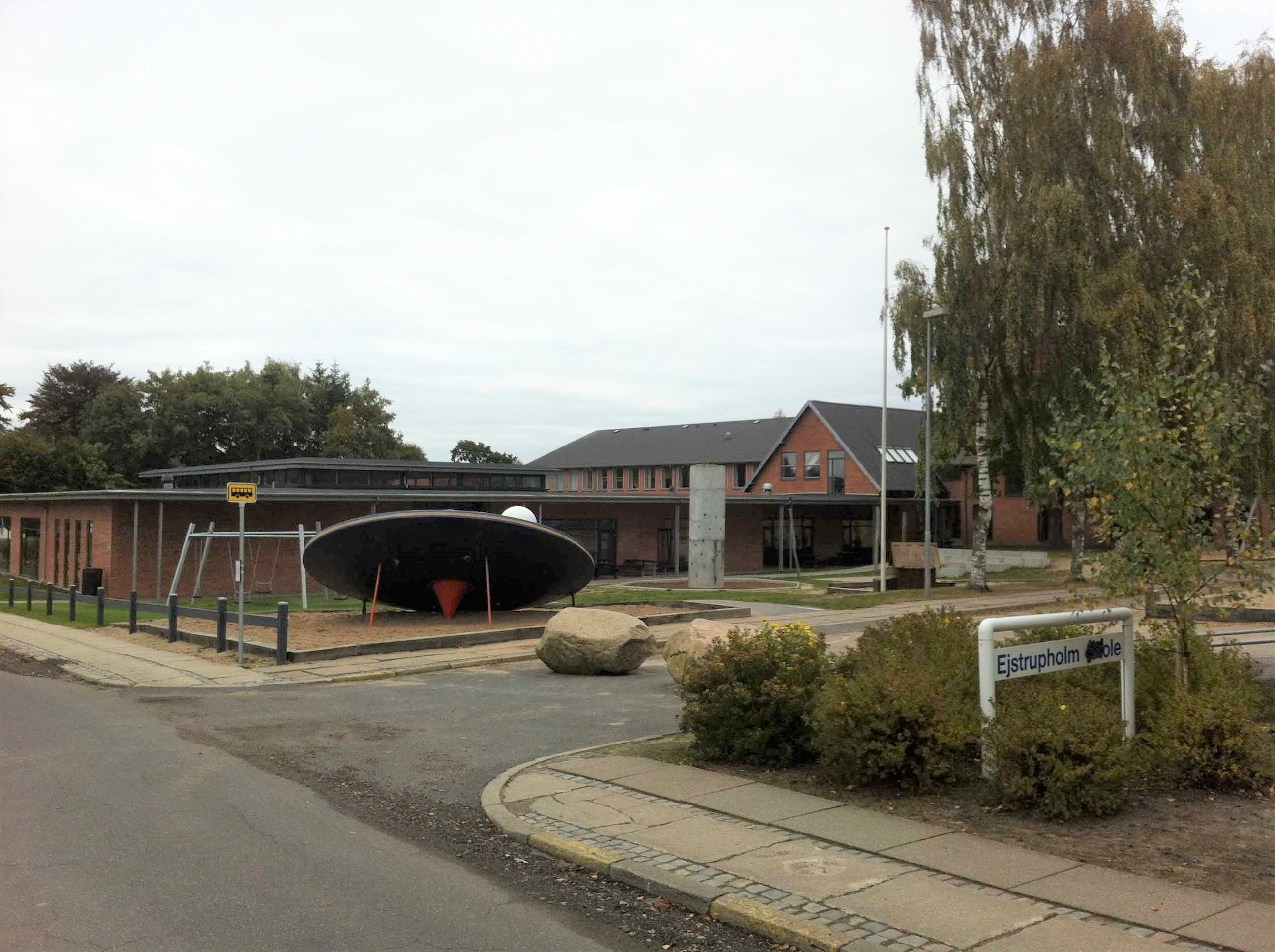
- Ejstrupholm School

- Location in Denmark Ejstrupholm (Central Denmark Region)
- Coordinates: 55°59′10″N 9°17′13″E
- Country: Denmark
- Region: Central Denmark (Midtjylland)
- Municipality: Ikast-Brande
- Parish: Ejstrup Parish

Area
  - Urban: 1.5 km^{2} (0.58 sq mi)

Population (2026)
  - Urban: 1,732
  - Urban density: 1,200/km^{2} (3,000/sq mi)
- Time zone: UTC+1 (CET)
  - Summer (DST): UTC+2 (CEST)
- Postal code: DK-7361 Ejstrupholm

Ejstrupholm is a town, with a population of 1,732 (1 January 2026), in Ikast-Brande Municipality, Central Denmark Region in Denmark. It is located 31 km southwest of Silkeborg, 13 km northeast of Brande and 21 km south of Ikast.

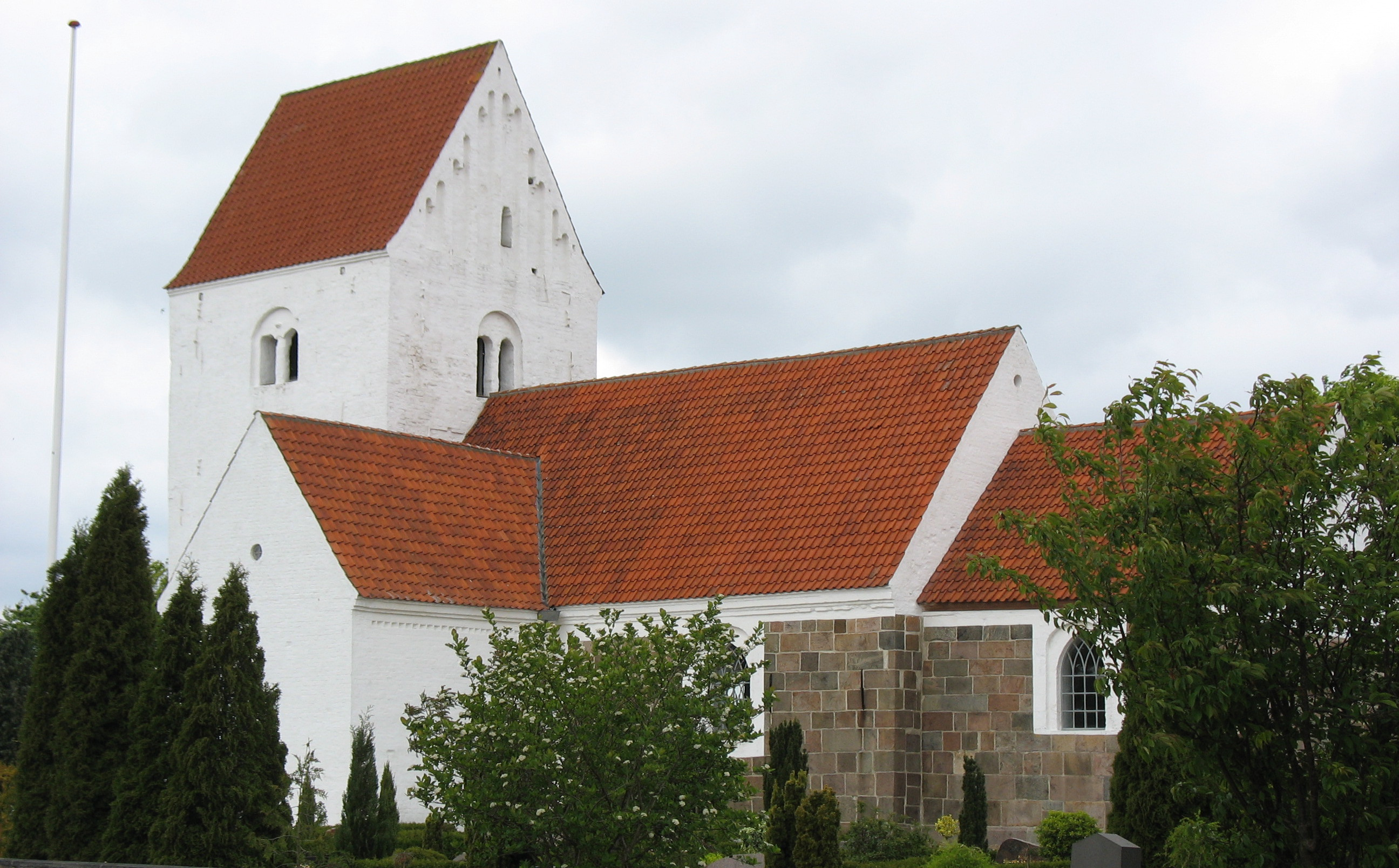
Ejstrup Church in Ejstrupholm

Ejstrup Church, built approximately in the year 1100, is located in the town.
