= Emilie Andersen =

Danish historian and archivist

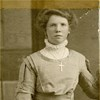
Emilie Andersen (1915)

Ottine Caroline Emilie Andersen (1895–1970) was a Danish historian and archivist. An intricate researcher, her first published work Grams Historie (1926) was a detailed history of the Gram Estate at Gram in the south of Jutland which she undertook for its owner Adolph Brockenhuus Schack. After working for the Provincial Archives of Southern Jutland and then those of Zealand, in 1958 she was engaged by the National Archives where she developed a legendary competence in documenting historical records, in particular the archives of Christian II, integrating sources from Stockholm and Oslo. The corresponding registry titled München-Samlingen was published in 1969 as Volume 15 of Vejledende Arkivregistraturer.

== Biography ==
Born on 26 March 1895 in Grødde, Ikast, Ottine Caroline Emilie Andersen was one of the nine children of the farmer Christian Andersen (1854–1938) and Kirsten Christiansen Larsen (1858–1947). After matriculating from high school in 1914, she studied history under Erik Arup at the University of Copenhagen, earning a master's degree in 1929. After working for a short period for the Danish-Icelandic archives and as an assistant at the provincial archives in Viborg, in 1933 she was employed by the provincial archives in Åbenrå and in 1935 by the provincial archives for Zealand. In 1958, she was engaged by the National Archives in Copenhagen.

After working on the history of the Gram estate, she developed a special interest in the history of Southern Jutland. This led to her development of the Hansborg Archives devoted to John of Denmark (1544–1580) and the publication of De Hansborgske Registranter in two volumes (1943 and 1949).

Emilie Andersen died on 10 November 1970 in Copenhagen.
