= Bording railway station =

Railway station in Jutland, Denmark

Bording
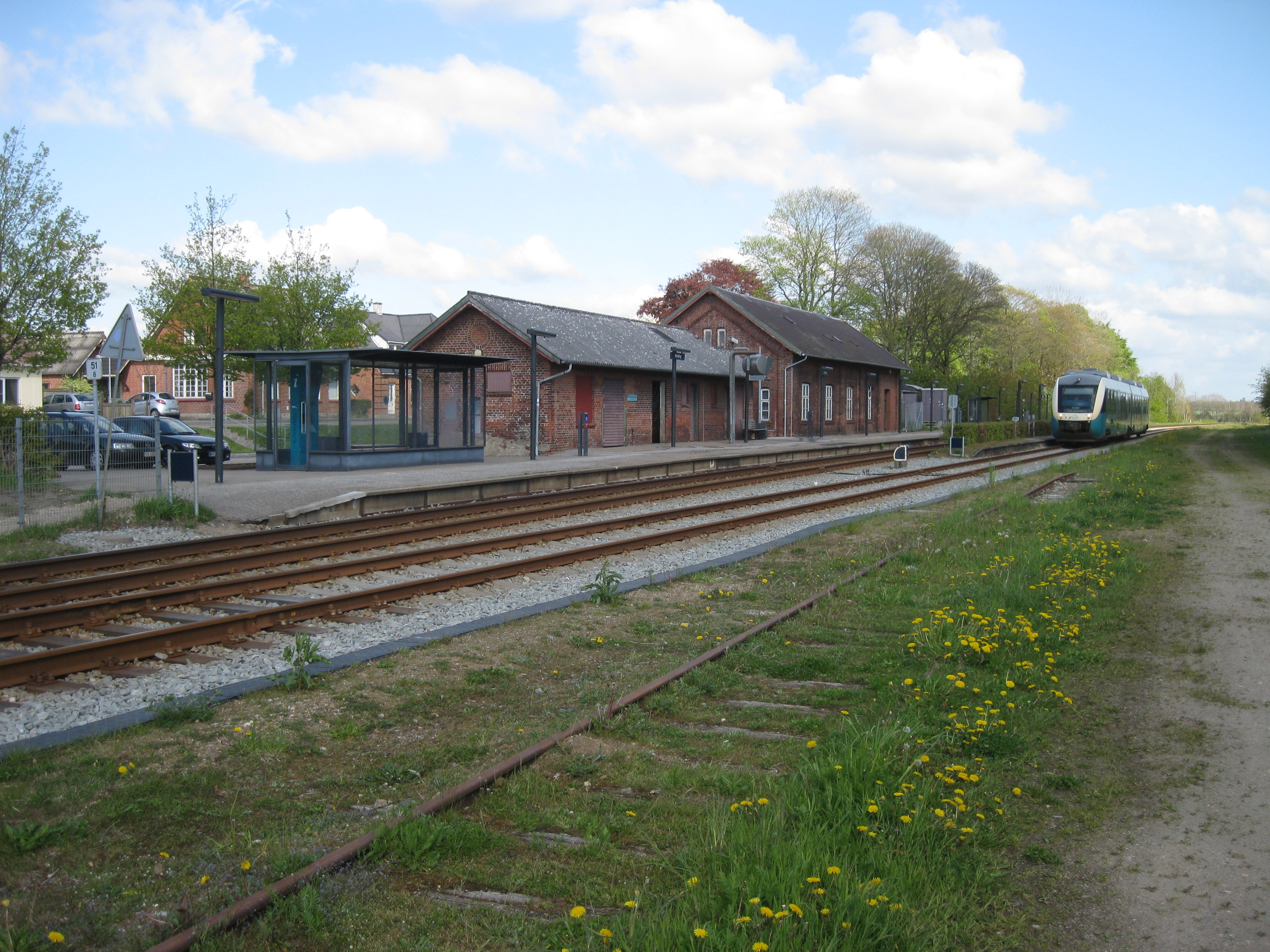
- Bording station in 2015

General information
- Location: Jernbanevej 2; 7441 Bording; Ikast-Brande Municipality; Denmark
- Coordinates: 56°08′48″N 9°16′41″E
- Elevation: 78.1 metres (256 ft)
- Owner: DSB (station infrastructure); Banedanmark (rail infrastructure)
- Line: Skanderborg–Skjern
- Platforms: 2
- Tracks: 2
- Train operators: GoCollective

Other information
- Website: Official website

History
- Opened: 28 August 1877

Services
Preceding station	GoCollective	Following station
Ikast towards Skjern	Aarhus–Skjern Regional train	Engesvang towards Aarhus Central
Location

Bording station is a railway station serving the railway town of Bording in Central Jutland, Denmark.

Bording station is located on the Skanderborg–Skjern line. The station opened in 1877. It offers direct regional train services to Aarhus, Skjern and Struer operated by the private public transport company GoCollective.

== See also ==
- List of railway stations in Denmark
