= State Prison at Nr. Snede =

Prison in Denmark

The State Prison at Nr. Snede
- Location within Central Denmark Region Location within Denmark
- Location: Nørre Snede, Central Denmark Region, Denmark.; 55.94442°N 9.41417°E
- Status: Operational
- Opened: 1943
- Managed by: The Danish Prison and Probation Service
- Warden: Anne Marie Borggaard

Nørre Snede Prison (Danish: Nørre Snede Fængsel), also known as the State Prison at Nr. Snede (Danish: Statsfængslet ved Nr. Snede), is a prison located near Nørre Snede in Denmark. The location where the prison now stands was once the site of a girls' home but has been a prison since 1943.

== Capacity ==
The State Prison at Nr. Snede has an open unit with a capacity of 75, a closed unit with a capacity of 85 and a special unit for penalty and isolation with a capacity of 15. The prison mostly receive male prisoners from Zealand and the Copenhagen area in spite of this prison's geographical location in Jutland.

== Employment ==
The prisoners in the open section mainly works with maintenance, carpentry, animal keeping and assembly work. Prisoners in the closed section mainly works with maintenance and assembly work.

== Education programs ==
The prisoners in the prison can attend either Preparatory Adult Education (in Danish and Mathematics), General Adult Education (in Danish, IT, Mathematics, English), Special Education for dyslexic people, refresher courses (in Danish and Mathematics for Technical school), various courses in sports, cooking and cost theory as well as courses in AutoCad.

== Treatment programs ==
The prison offers drug rehabilitation, cognitive proficiency and anger management programs to prisoners.
