= Engesvang =

- Town
- Location in Denmark Engesvang (Central Denmark Region)
- Coordinates: 56°10′15″N 9°20′53″E
- Country: Denmark
- Region: Central Denmark (Midtjylland)
- Municipal: Ikast-Brande

Area
  - Urban: 1.7 km^{2} (0.66 sq mi)

Population (2026)
  - Urban: 2,205
  - Urban density: 1,300/km^{2} (3,400/sq mi)
- Time zone: UTC+1 (CET)
  - Summer (DST): UTC+2 (CEST)
- Postal code: DK-7442 Engesvang

Engesvang is a town with a population of 2,205 (1 January 2026), in Ikast-Brande Municipality, Denmark. It is located 58 km north of Vejle, 5 km northeast of Bording and 33 km south of Viborg. The road between Vejle and Viborg (Danish national road 13) crosses the Aarhus-Herning motorway on a bridge 4 km south of Engesvang, just south of the small village of Pårup.

The town is a railway town between Silkeborg and Ikast, served by Engesvang railway station on the Skanderborg–Skjern railway line.

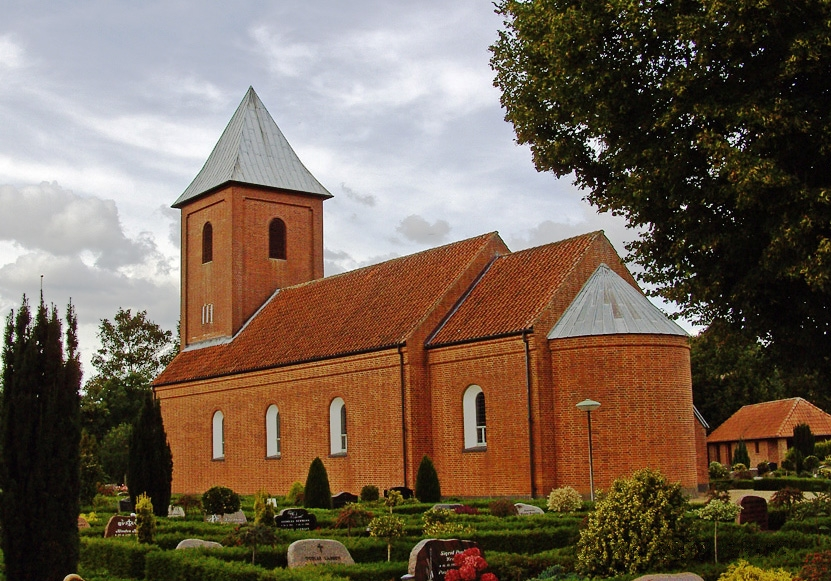
Engesvang Church

Engesvang Church, build in 1897, is located in the original village of Engesvang Kirkeby on the northwestern outskirts of the town.

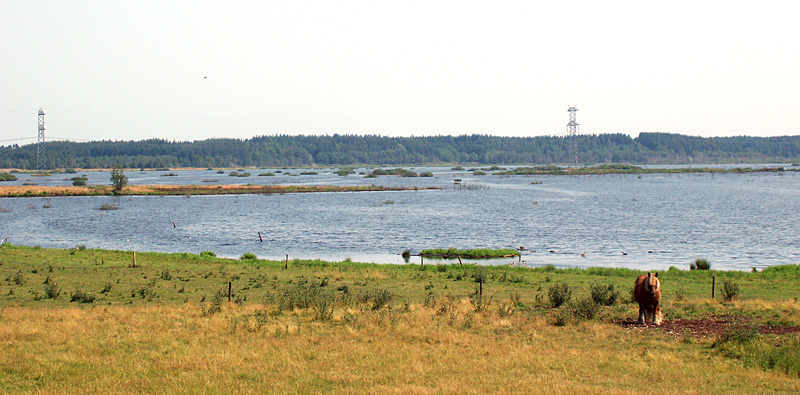
Bølling Lake

Engesvang is located just west of Bølling Lake a shallow lake used extensively for recreation.
