= Bølling Lake =

Lake in Silkeborg Municipality, Denmark

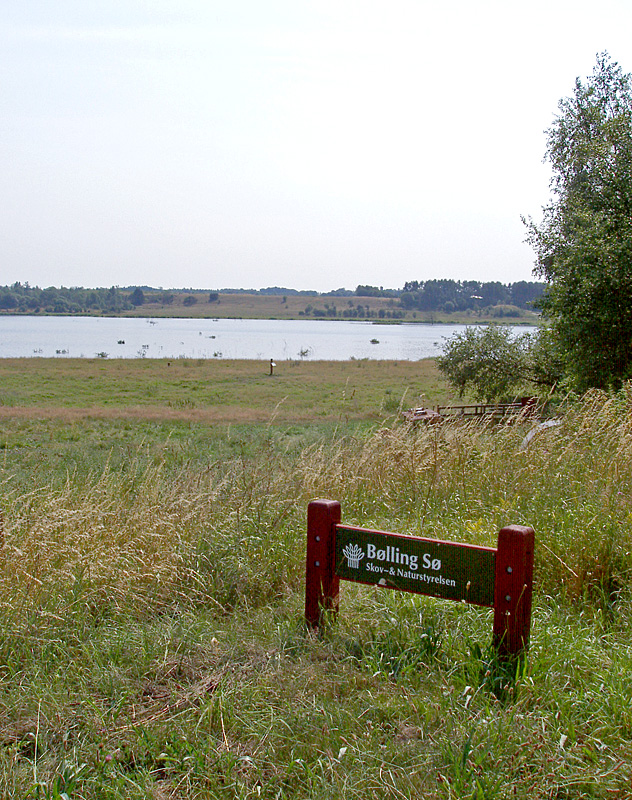

- Location within Denmark
- Location: central Jutland
- Coordinates: 56°10′50″N 9°22′20″E
- Basin countries: Denmark

Bølling Lake (Danish: Bølling Sø), is a shallow lake of central Jutland in Denmark, slightly west of Silkeborg, between Kragelund and Engesvang.

The lake is geologically important because it has been at the edge of the Pleistocene glacier. In the 1870s the lake was drained to accommodate the peat industry, giving science a chance to examine its bogs and historians and prehistorians a chance to examine the artifacts and human remains. A late Pleistocene period of warm climate (an interstadial) was named for the lake based on evidence gathered here (see Bølling oscillation).

Some 50 peat factories were built in the region. Eventually, the decision was made to protect the remaining peat and in 2003 the region became a conservation area. The lake was to some degree restored. Today it is used extensively for recreation.
