= Nørre Snede =

- Town
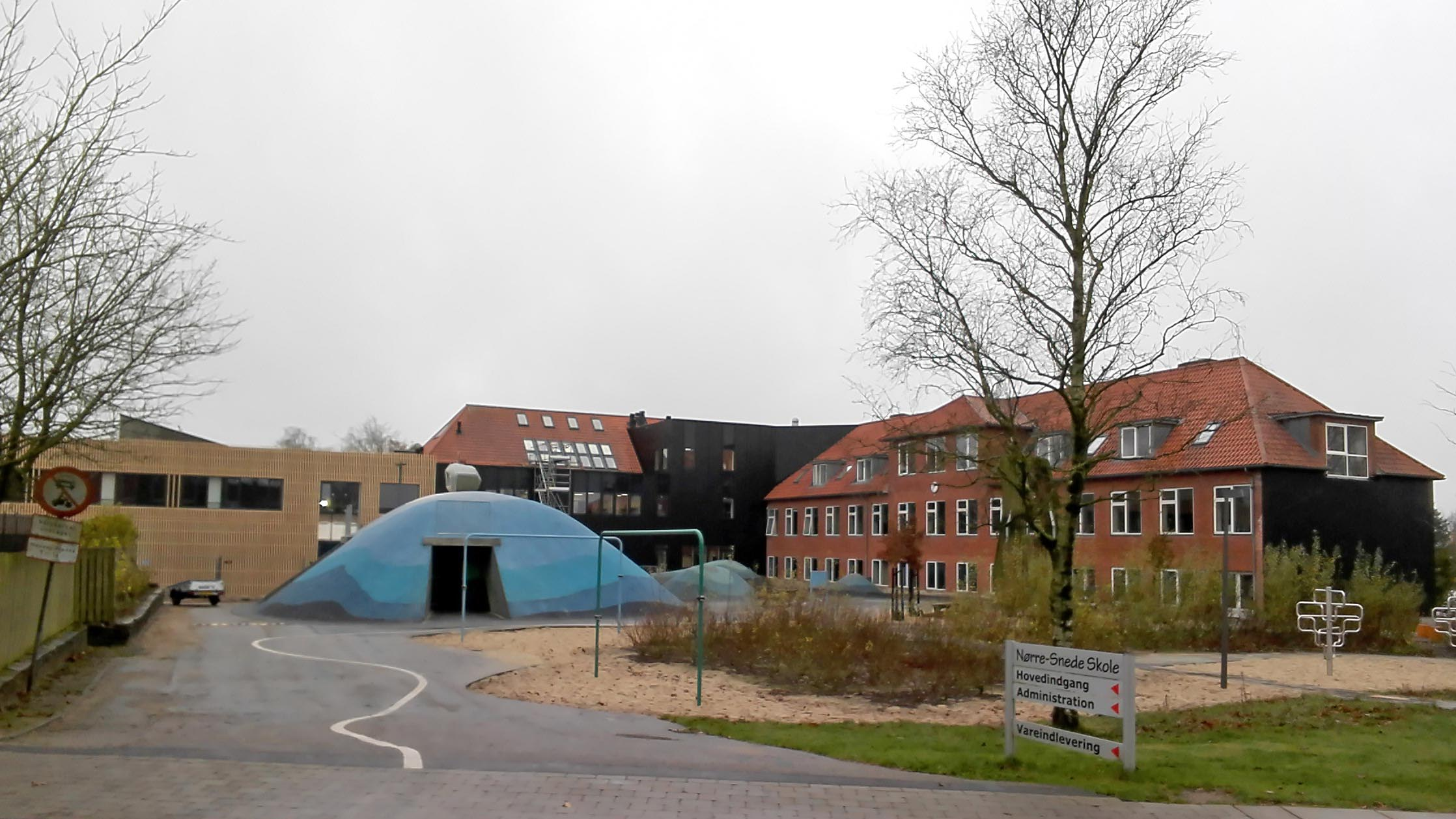
- Nørre Snede School

- Location in Denmark Nørre Snede (Central Denmark Region)
- Coordinates: 55°57′50″N 9°23′55″E
- Country: Denmark
- Region: Central Denmark (Midtjylland)
- Municipality: Ikast-Brande

Area
  - Urban: 1.8 km^{2} (0.69 sq mi)

Population (2026)
  - Urban: 1,928
  - Urban density: 1,100/km^{2} (2,800/sq mi)
- Time zone: UTC+1 (CET)
  - Summer (DST): UTC+2 (CEST)
- Postal code: DK-8766 Nørre Snede

Nørre Snede is a town, with a population of 1,928 (1 January 2026), in Ikast-Brande Municipality, Central Denmark Region in Denmark. It is located 34 km north of Vejle, 21 km northeast of Give, 30 km south of Silkeborg and 32 km west of Horsens.

Nørre Snede was the municipal seat of the former Nørre-Snede Municipality until 1 January 2007.

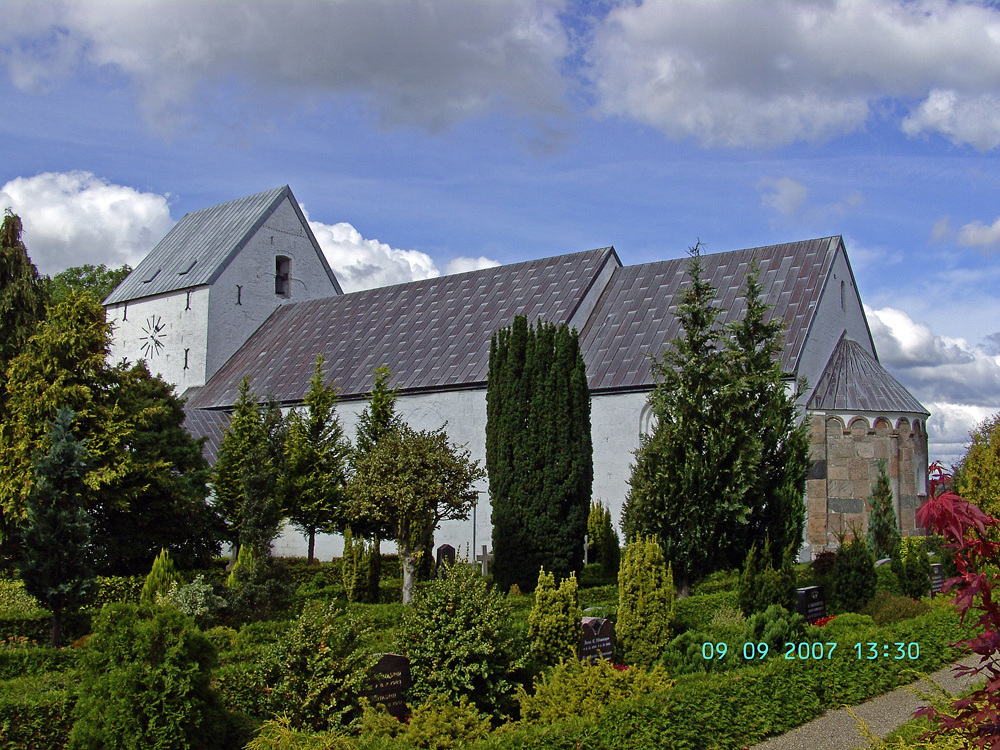
Nørre Snede Church

Nørre Snede Church is a Romanesque church build with Gothic modifications and can be dated back to the 12th century.

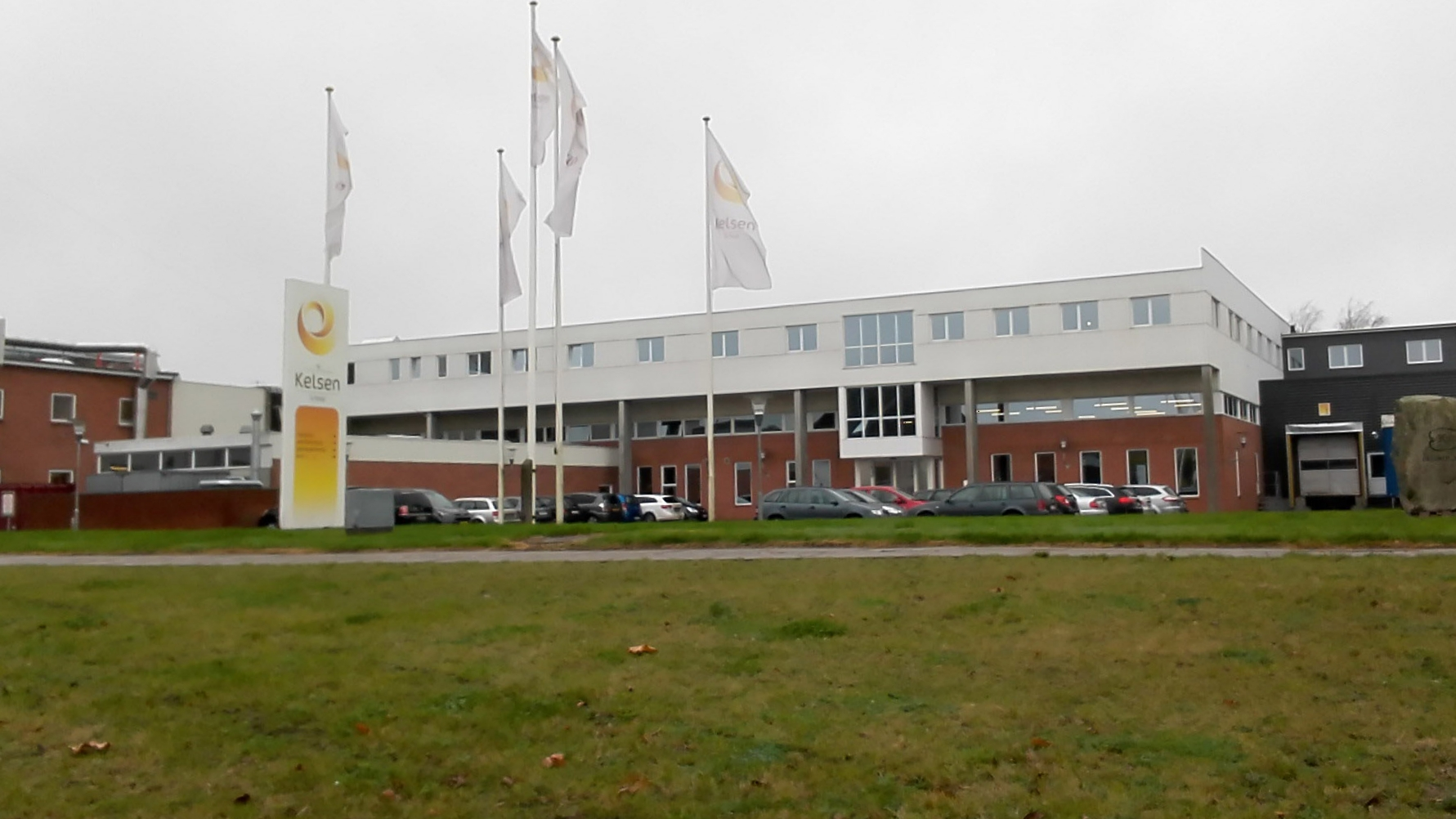
Kelsen Group A/S

Kelsen Group, a manufacturer of Danish butter cookies is located in the town.

The historic Nørre Snede Windmill, build in 1848, was brought to America in pieces, where it was rebuilt in the Danish village of Elk Horn in 1976.

The State Prison at Nr. Snede is located 3 km south of the town.
