= Urban districts of Denmark =

Type of administrative division in Denmark

An urban district (Danish: bydel; lit. "city part") is the name used for urban or municipality districts in some of the larger municipalities of Denmark. The term is not strictly defined, but is usually bigger than a quarter or a city block.

Administrative districts in the Copenhagen Municipality 2007-

== Districts of Copenhagen ==
There are 10 urban districts in Copenhagen, each with a local city council (Danish: lokaludvalg). The districts are Indre By, Vesterbro/Kongens Enghave, Nørrebro, Østerbro, Amager Øst, Amager Vest, Valby, Bispebjerg, Vanløse, and Brønshøj-Husum.

Vesterbro and Kongens Enghave have separate local councils and Indre By has a local council from Christianshavn as well, so there are 12 local city councils.

== Districts of Aahus ==
Aarhus is divided into several districts and suburbs with its own postal code (Danish: postdistrikter).

Districts (boroughs) inside the 2nd city beltway:

- Aarhus C
- Aarhus N
- Aarhus V
- Aarhus S
- Åbyhøj
- Viby
- Brabrand
