= Bording, Denmark =

Railway town in Ikast-Brande, Denmark

Bording
- Town
- Location in Denmark Bording (Central Denmark Region)
- Coordinates: 56°8′38″N 9°16′32″E
- Country: Denmark
- Region: Central Denmark (Midtjylland)
- Municipality: Ikast-Brande

Area
  - Urban: 1.7 km^{2} (0.66 sq mi)

Population (2026)
  - Urban: 2,455
  - Urban density: 1,400/km^{2} (3,700/sq mi)
- Time zone: UTC+1 (CET)
  - Summer (DST): UTC+2 (CEST)
- Postal code: DK-7441 Bording

Bording is a railway town, with a population of 2,455 (1 January 2026), in Ikast-Brande Municipality, Central Denmark Region in Denmark.

Bording is located between Silkeborg and Ikast at the Danish national road 15. It is served by Bording railway station on the Skanderborg–Skjern railway line.

In 1999 the local handball club Bording KFUM joined the elite team Ikast-Bording EH, which has won the Danish Women's Championship and EHF European League several times.
