= Ikast =

- Town
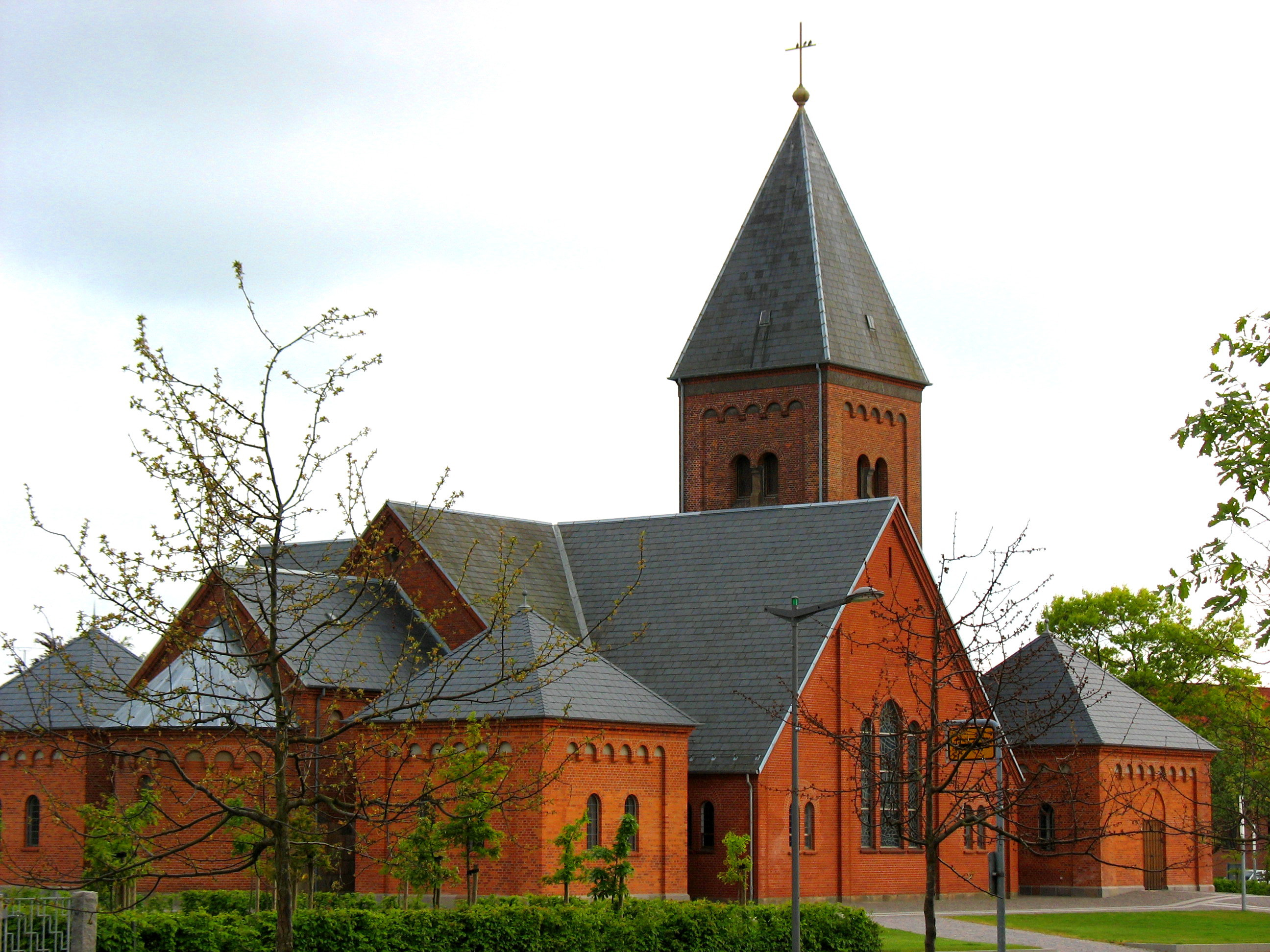
- Ikast Church

- Location in Denmark Ikast (Central Denmark Region)
- Coordinates: 56°08′N 09°09′E
- Country: Denmark
- Region: Central Denmark (Midtjylland)
- Municipality: Ikast-Brande

Government
  - Mayor: Ib Lauritsen

Area
  - Urban: 11.7 km^{2} (4.5 sq mi)

Population (2026)
  - Urban: 16,999
  - Urban density: 1,450/km^{2} (3,760/sq mi)
  - Gender: 8,564 males and 8,435 females
- Time zone: UTC+1 (Central Europe Time)
  - Summer (DST): UTC+2

Ikast is a Danish town in Central Denmark Region (Region Midtjylland). It is the seat of Ikast-Brande Municipality since 2007. It was the seat of the former Ikast Municipality.

== Geography ==
The town is situated in the middle of Jutland. The town is situated 5 km from Hammerum, which is on the Eastern outskirts of Herning Municipality. Ikast is situated 28 km from Silkeborg, and 69 km away from Aarhus.

== Demography ==
As of 1 January 2024, the population of the town is 16,535.

== History ==
Up until late in the nineteenth century, Ikast was nothing more than a few buildings surrounding the church. During industrialization, Ikast established a strong presence in Denmark as one of the main towns for the textile industry, which was the main industry in the area until the start of globalization, when production jobs were outsourced.

The opening of the railway line in the 1850s led to an increase in population, as the existing part of town surrounding the church, and the new part of town, built around the railway station, grew into each other.

The church was originally a Romanesque church, built in the 13th century. The old church burned down in 1904, and was rebuilt into the new church, which was finished in 1907. The church was expanded several times, with the latest expansion happening in 2005.

== Sport ==
The local soccer team Ikast FS was one of the founding clubs of FC Midtjylland, together with Herning Fremad. From 1978 to 1991 Ikast FS played in the top Danish division as an independent club.

The handball team Ikast Håndbold is one of the most successful clubs in the Danish Women's League.

== Notable people ==
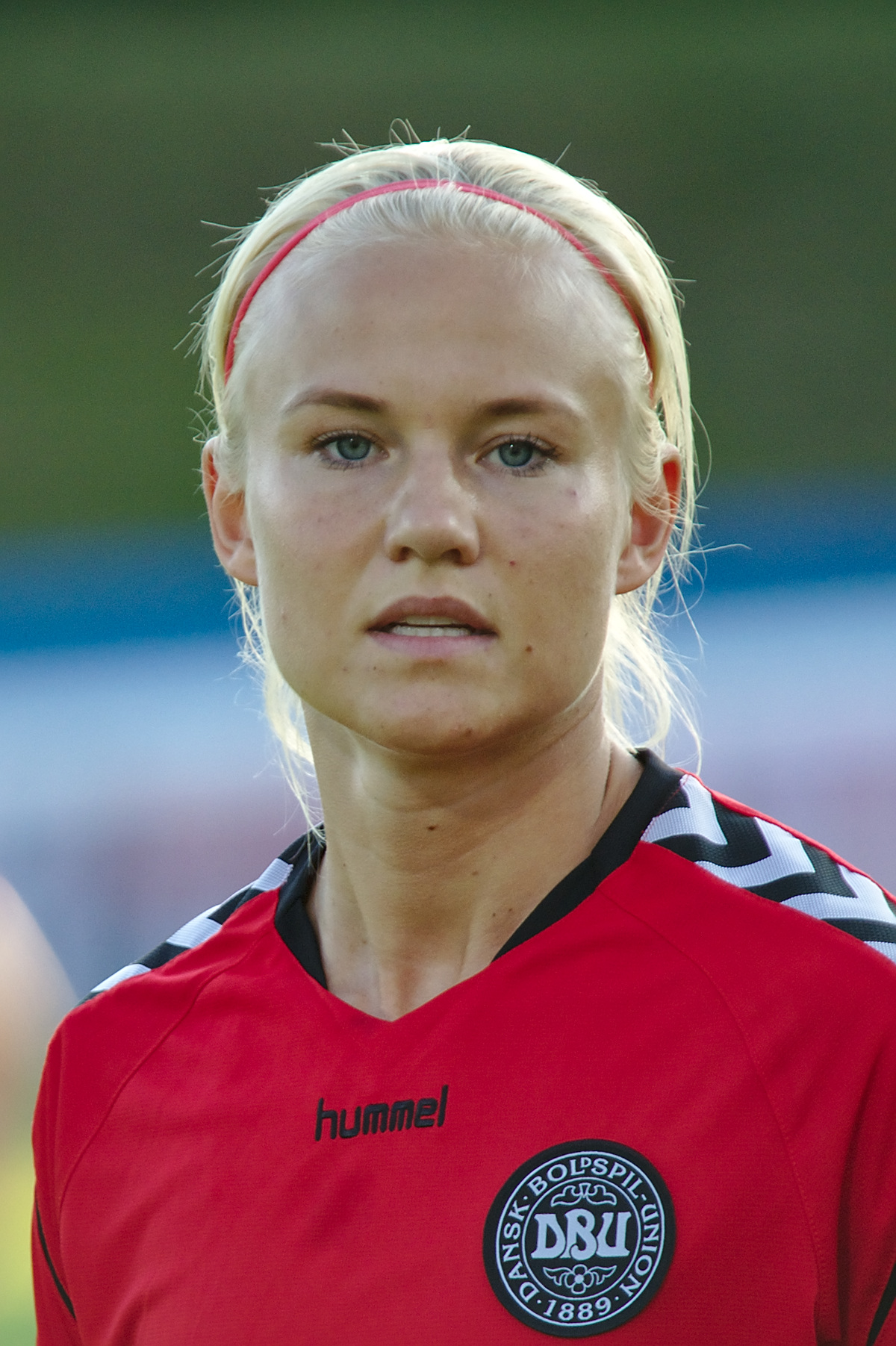
Pernille Harder, 2017

- Emilie Andersen (1895 in Grødde, Ikast – 1970) a Danish historian and archivist.
- Bo Skovhus (born 1962 in Ikast) a Danish baritone opera singer
- Kurt Aust (born 1955 in Ikast) pen name of Kurt Østergaard, an author and freelance writer

=== Sport ===
- Jens Reno Møller (born 1971 in Ikast) is a Danish racing driver
- Peder Nissen (born 1976 in Ikast) a former badminton player, twice Danish National champion
- Pernille Harder (born 1992 in Ikast) a Danish professional footballer, named in 2018 and 2020 Europe's best footballer
- Jens Martin Gammelby (born 1995 in Ikast) a Danish footballer, who plays for Silkeborg IF
- Lasse Mølhede (born 1995 in Ikast) a Danish badminton player
- Karen Holmgaard (born 1999) a professional footballer for the Denmark national team
- Sara Holmgaard (born 1999) a professional footballer for the Denmark national team
- Simon Birch (born 2007 in Ikast) a Danish racing driver
