= Ikast-Brande Municipality =

Ikast-Brande Municipality Ikast-Brande Kommune (Danish)
- Municipality
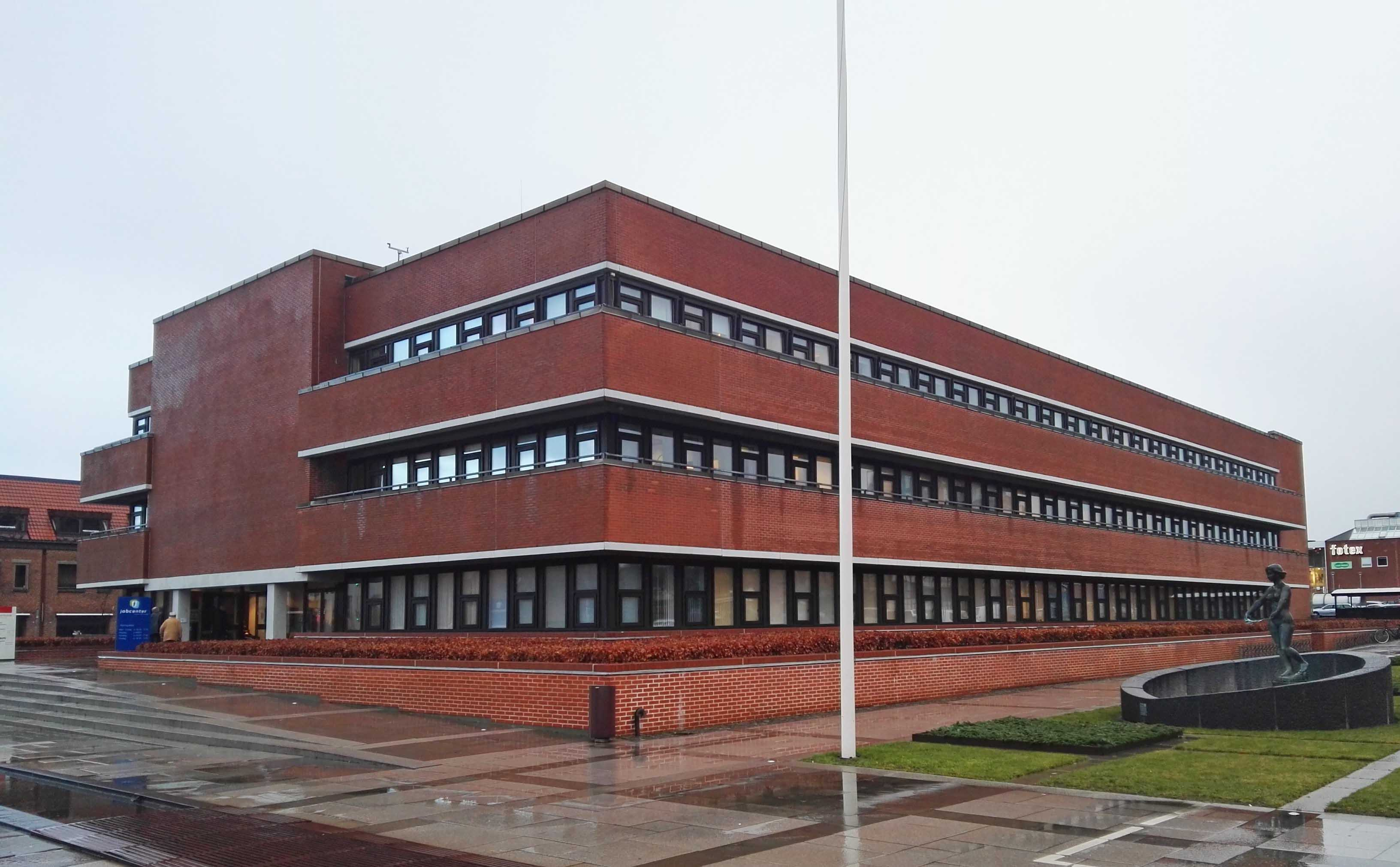
- Town hall

- Coat of arms

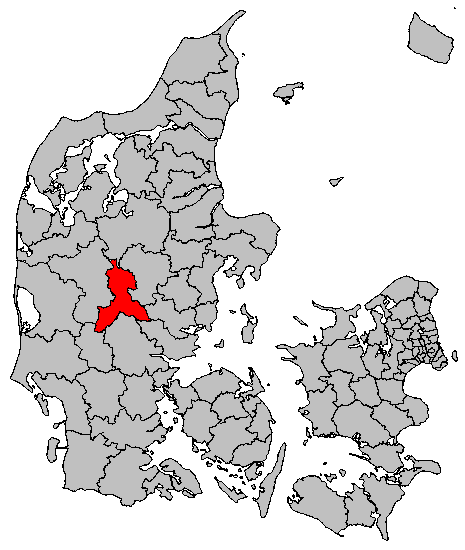
- Location in Denmark
- Coordinates: 56°08′27″N 9°09′06″E
- Country: Denmark
- Region: Central Denmark
- Established: 1 January 2007

Government
  - Mayor: Ib Boye Lauritsen

Area
  - Total: 736.41 km^{2} (284.33 sq mi)

Population (1 January 2026)
  - Total: 43,305
  - Density: 58.806/km^{2} (152.31/sq mi)
- Time zone: UTC+1 (CET)
  - Summer (DST): UTC+2 (CEST)
- Postal code: 7430
- Website: www.ikast-brande.dk

Ikast-Brande Municipality (Danish: Ikast-Brande Kommune) is a municipality (Danish: kommune) in Region Midtjylland in Denmark. It covers an area of 733.69 km^{2} and has a population of 43,305 (1 January 2026).

On 1 January 2007 Ikast-Brande municipality was created as the result of Kommunalreformen ("The Municipal Reform" of 2007), consisting of the former municipalities of Brande, Ikast, and Nørre-Snede.

== List of settlements ==
#	Settlement	Population (2010)	Population (2025)
1	Ikast	14,847	16,808
2	Brande	6,872	7,394
3	Bording	2,317	2,439
4	Engesvang	1,979	2,190
5	Nørre Snede	1,867	1,912
6	Ejstrupholm	1,689	1,710
7	Isenvad	605	702
8	Tulstrup	603	617
9	Klovborg	528	516
10	Blåhøj	365	367
11	Hampen	362	333
12	Gludsted	316	319
13	Uhre	279	260
14	Pårup	212	239

== Politics ==
=== Municipal council ===
Ikast-Brande's municipal council consists of 23 members, elected every four years.

Below are the municipal councils elected since the Municipal Reform of 2007.

Election	Party										Total seats	Turnout	Elected mayor
Election	A	C	D	F	I	K	L	O	V	Æ	Total seats	Turnout	Elected mayor
2005	6	2				1	8	2	8		27	73.9%	Carsten Kissmeyer (V)
2009	5	2		1			8	2	7		25	71.4%	Carsten Kissmeyer (V)
2013	6	1					5	2	9		23	75.3%	Carsten Kissmeyer (V)
2017	6	3					2	3	9		23	72.5%	Ib Boye Lauritsen (V)
2021	6	5	1				2	2	7		23	66.7%	Ib Boye Lauritsen (V)
2025	4	3			1		3	3	7	2	23	67.2%	Ib Boye Lauritsen (V)
Data from Kmdvalg.dk 2005, 2009, 2013, 2017 and 2021. Data from valg.dk 2025
