= 2021 Silkeborg municipal election =

← 2017	16 November 2021	2025 →

All 31 seats to the Silkeborg Municipal Council 16 seats needed for a majority
- Turnout: 55,182 (73.3%) ▼1.4pp
	First party	Second party	Third party
	A	V	C
Party	Social Democrats	Venstre	Conservatives
Last election	10 seats, 30.1%	11 seats, 32.8%	1 seats, 4.5%
Seats won	10	8	6
Seat change	0	▼3	▲5
Popular vote	15,523	14,509	7,671
Percentage	28.6%	26.7%	14.1%
Swing	▼1.5%	▼6.1%	▲9.6%
	Fourth party	Fifth party	Sixth party
	Ø	F	B
Party	Red–Green Alliance	Green Left	Social Liberals
Last election	2 seats, 5.5%	2 seats, 7.2%	1 seats, 4.2%
Seats won	2	2	2
Seat change	0	0	▲1
Popular vote	4,174	3,611	2,892
Percentage	7.7%	6.6%	5.3%
Swing	▲2.2%	▼0.6%	▲1.1%
	Seventh party	Eighth party	Ninth party
	D	O	I
Party	New Right	Danish People's Party	Liberal Alliance
Last election	Did not stand	2 seats, 6.2%	1 seats, 3,6%
Seats won	1	0	0
Seat change	▲1	▼2	▼1
Popular vote	2,225	1,253	692
Percentage	4.1%	2.3%	1.3
Swing	New	▼3.9%	▼2.3
Mayor before election
Steen Vindum
Venstre
Mayor after election
Helle Gade
Social Democrats

In 2021 Silkeborg Municipality had had mayors from 3 different parties since the 2007 municipal reform: the Conservatives from 2007 to 2009, the Social Democrats from 2010 to 2013, and Venstre from 2014 to 2021. The 2021 election was seen as an election that could tilt either way, and was likely to be dependent on the position of the Social Liberals. Both Venstre and Social Democrats decreased their vote share, but the Social Democrats didn't lose any seats, while Venstre lost 3 seats, and this meant the Social Democrats would be the biggest party in the following period. On December 10, 2021, a municipal council with Social Democrat Helle Gade as mayor was announced.

== Electoral system ==
For elections to Danish municipalities, a number of candidates varying from 9 to 31, depending on the municipality, are chosen to be elected to the municipal council. The seats are then allocated using the D'Hondt method and a closed-list proportional representation. Silkeborg Municipality had 31 seats in 2021

Unlike in Danish General Elections, in elections to municipal councils, electoral alliances are allowed.

== Electoral alliances ==
=== Electoral Alliance 1 ===
Party		Political alignment
A	Social Democrats	Centre-left
F	Green Left	Centre-left to Left-wing
Æ	Freedom List	Right-wing to Far-right
Ø	Red–Green Alliance	Left-wing to Far-Left

=== Electoral Alliance 2 ===
Party		Political alignment
B	Social Liberals	Centre to Centre-left
K	Christian Democrats	Centre to Centre-right
Å	The Alternative	Centre-left to Left-wing

=== Electoral Alliance 3 ===
Party		Political alignment
C	Conservatives	Centre-right
D	New Right	Right-wing to Far-right
I	Liberal Alliance	Centre-right to Right-wing
O	Danish People's Party	Right-wing to Far-right

== Results by polling station ==
E = Carsen Ørum Skytt
Æ = Deltagerlisten

Division	A	B	C	D	E	F	I	K	O	V	Æ	Ø	Å
Division	%	%	%	%	%	%	%	%	%	%	%	%	%
Ans	31.1	1.2	8.4	4.6	0.0	4.3	0.7	3.9	2.9	38.5	0.2	4.1	0.2
Funder	28.7	4.0	18.1	5.3	0.0	5.6	1.8	1.8	2.3	23.2	0.5	8.2	0.4
Fårvang	25.7	1.7	6.9	6.3	0.0	4.8	0.9	3.6	7.9	38.2	0.0	3.2	0.8
Gjern	21.1	2.5	8.6	2.9	0.0	5.8	0.9	18.5	1.9	30.0	0.2	7.2	0.3
Grauballe	32.4	1.0	6.2	6.1	0.0	6.2	1.2	3.0	2.1	37.6	0.3	3.6	0.3
Gødvad	30.7	5.0	15.3	4.1	0.1	6.5	1.6	2.5	2.0	22.7	0.2	7.7	1.6
Kjellerup	25.2	1.8	6.7	3.3	0.0	7.5	0.6	1.6	2.7	47.1	0.1	3.3	0.1
Kragelund	33.5	1.4	23.9	5.1	0.0	3.1	0.4	2.3	2.9	21.6	0.1	5.6	0.1
Lemming	31.6	4.8	6.8	5.9	0.0	9.2	1.8	1.8	4.5	27.8	0.6	5.2	0.1
Linå	24.6	4.3	14.2	7.0	0.0	7.0	1.9	1.9	3.4	20.9	0.2	13.6	1.0
Resenbro	36.0	3.4	14.7	3.7	0.1	3.0	2.2	1.7	1.6	21.6	0.0	11.9	0.2
Sejling	27.5	6.4	12.1	5.2	0.2	10.3	2.1	2.3	2.0	27.2	0.4	4.3	0.2
Sejs	22.4	2.7	23.1	2.5	0.0	4.6	0.6	0.4	1.1	33.8	0.2	8.5	0.2
Sjørslev	26.0	1.3	4.6	5.4	0.0	8.0	0.2	1.5	17.8	32.1	0.6	2.2	0.4
Sorring	35.3	1.7	30.5	3.5	0.0	4.0	1.0	2.6	1.2	11.9	0.0	8.2	0.1
Thorning	20.0	1.4	5.4	5.8	0.0	12.2	0.7	1.6	2.7	47.3	0.1	2.2	0.6
Vinderslev	24.9	1.7	6.4	5.8	0.0	5.7	1.4	3.5	3.3	43.7	0.3	3.5	0.0
Voel	40.7	1.1	11.5	3.0	0.0	3.1	0.9	9.4	1.5	25.0	0.0	3.5	0.3
Balle	31.6	4.3	15.2	3.5	2.2	7.3	1.8	1.2	2.1	23.9	0.3	6.5	0.2
Bryrup	13.6	3.4	7.7	4.9	0.0	18.5	1.6	1.3	2.6	15.7	0.0	30.6	0.2
Buskelund	28.6	6.1	21.9	3.5	0.1	4.6	1.3	0.9	1.0	26.6	0.2	5.0	0.4
Gjessø	19.1	3.5	10.8	4.7	0.1	5.8	1.9	1.2	2.3	40.7	0.3	9.1	0.4
Hjøllund	20.9	4.7	10.6	5.5	0.0	9.1	0.4	1.2	2.8	15.0	0.0	28.3	1.6
Langsøskolen	35.2	5.1	12.4	3.3	0.1	7.9	0.9	0.8	1.9	23.2	0.7	7.2	1.2
Lysbro	29.7	6.1	19.0	3.0	0.1	7.3	1.8	0.9	1.6	22.2	0.2	7.7	0.4
Alderslyst	34.8	4.8	12.9	3.9	0.6	7.1	0.8	1.0	1.8	20.1	2.1	8.9	1.3
Jysk Arena	34.0	4.4	14.9	3.6	0.1	6.5	1.1	1.4	2.6	18.2	1.0	8.0	4.0
Them	21.6	19.5	8.2	6.9	0.0	5.6	1.5	0.7	2.7	25.2	0.1	7.5	0.3
Vestergadehallen	28.6	5.8	16.3	3.7	0.0	7.8	1.7	0.7	1.6	22.1	0.3	10.7	0.5
Virklund	23.5	23.9	14.8	3.1	0.2	5.0	1.4	0.4	1.2	19.7	0.0	6.7	0.1

== Results ==
Party		Votes	%	+/-	Seats	+/-
Silkeborg Municipality
A	Social Democrats	15,523	28.56	-1.50	10	0
V	Venstre	14,509	26.70	-6.09	8	-3
C	Conservatives	7,671	14.11	+9.66	6	+5
Ø	Red-Green Alliance	4,174	7.68	+2.14	2	0
F	Green Left	3,611	6.64	-0.57	2	0
B	Social Liberals	2,892	5.32	+1.13	2	+1
D	New Right	2,225	4.09	New	1	New
O	Danish People's Party	1,253	2.31	-3.92	0	-2
K	Christian Democrats	1,088	2.00	+1.11	0	0
I	Liberal Alliance	692	1.27	-2.37	0	-1
Å	The Alternative	408	0.75	-1.71	0	-1
Æ	Deltagerlisten	195	0.36	+0.01	0	0
E	Carsten Ørum Skytt	109	0.20	New	0	New
Total		54,350	100	N/A	31	N/A
Invalid votes		258	0.34	+0.22		
Blank votes		574	0.76	-0.14		
Turnout		55,182	73.34	-1.33		
Source: valg.dk
