= 2025 Silkeborg municipal election =

Municipal election in Denmark

← 2021	18 November 2025	2029 →

All 31 seats to the Silkeborg municipal council 16 seats needed for a majority
- Turnout: 58,794 (73.9%) ▲0.6%
	First party	Second party	Third party
	A	V	F
Party	Social Democrats	Venstre	Green Left
Last election	10 seats, 28.6%	8 seats, 26.7%	2 seats, 6.6%
Seats won	10	7	3
Seat change	0	▼1	▲1
Popular vote	15,880	12,450	6,130
Percentage	27.4%	21.5%	10.6%
Swing	▼1.1%	▼5.2%	▲3.9%
	Fourth party	Fifth party	Sixth party
	C	I	Ø
Party	Conservatives	Liberal Alliance	Red-Green Alliance
Last election	6 seats, 14.1%	0 seats, 1.3%	2 seats, 7.7%
Seats won	3	2	2
Seat change	▼3	▲2	0
Popular vote	5,724	4,330	4,031
Percentage	9.9%	7.5%	7.0%
Swing	▼4.2%	▲6.2%	▼0.7%
	Seventh party	Eighth party	Ninth party
	Æ	B	O
Party	Denmark Democrats	Social Liberals	Danish People's Party
Last election	Did not stand	2 seats, 5.3%	0 seats, 2.3%
Seats won	2	1	1
Seat change	▲2	▼1	▲1
Popular vote	3,544	2,947	2,295
Percentage	6.1%	5.1%	4.0%
Swing	New	▼0.2%	▲1.7%
Mayor before election
Helle Gade
Social Democrats
Mayor after election
Helle Gade
Social Democrats

The 2025 Silkeborg Municipal election was held on November 18, 2025, to elect the 31 members to sit in the regional council for the Silkeborg Municipal council, in the period of 2026 to 2029. Following a close election, Helle Gade from the Social Democrats, could secure the mayoral position.

== Background ==
Following the 2021 election, Helle Gade from Social Democrats became mayor for her first term. It was announced in April 2024, that Gade would be the leading candidate for the Social Democrats in this election, and thereby seeking a second consecutive term.

== Electoral system ==
For elections to Danish municipalities, a number varying from 9 to 31 are chosen to be elected to the municipal council. The seats are then allocated using the D'Hondt method and a closed list proportional representation. Silkeborg Municipality had 31 seats in 2025.

== Electoral alliances ==
=== Electoral Alliance 1 ===
Party		Political alignment
A	Social Democrats	Centre-left
F	Green Left	Centre-left to Left-wing
N	Deltagerlisten	Local politics
Ø	Red-Green Alliance	Left-wing to Far-Left

=== Electoral Alliance 2 ===
Party		Political alignment
B	Social Liberals	Centre to Centre-left
L	Louise Isager	Local politics
M	Moderates	Centre to Centre-right

=== Electoral Alliance 3 ===
Party		Political alignment
C	Conservatives	Centre-right
V	Venstre	Centre-right
Æ	Denmark Democrats	Right-wing to Far-right

=== Electoral Alliance 4 ===
Party		Political alignment
I	Liberal Alliance	Centre-right to Right-wing
O	Danish People's Party	Right-wing to Far-right

== Results by polling station ==
Division	A	B	C	F	I	L	M	N	O	V	Æ	Ø
Division	%	%	%	%	%	%	%	%	%	%	%	%
Ans	24.5	1.3	3.3	5.6	4.0	0.3	0.2	0.0	3.0	48.4	5.8	3.6
Funder	28.9	3.8	14.1	8.7	9.0	0.4	0.7	0.2	4.7	17.1	6.8	5.5
Fårvang	26.5	1.2	4.5	5.9	4.6	0.6	0.1	0.0	18.4	22.2	11.8	4.1
Gjern	30.8	2.1	8.1	6.0	4.4	0.3	0.1	0.0	3.2	32.7	4.4	7.9
Grauballe	26.5	2.1	6.4	5.9	8.2	1.0	0.3	0.0	4.9	34.3	6.4	4.1
Gødvad	30.7	4.5	11.9	11.8	9.3	0.2	0.5	0.1	3.9	16.0	4.2	7.0
Kjellerup	22.0	1.2	3.9	13.8	6.3	0.4	0.3	0.1	4.5	34.5	10.1	2.9
Kragelund	29.8	2.8	17.7	8.8	7.1	0.4	0.3	0.1	4.5	15.9	7.4	5.3
Lemming	20.9	6.1	5.7	11.5	8.3	1.1	1.3	0.1	5.6	23.0	9.5	6.8
Linå	22.7	4.9	7.3	13.6	7.0	0.0	0.5	0.1	5.8	20.8	6.9	10.5
Resenbro	31.2	2.9	9.1	8.7	6.8	0.4	0.8	0.0	4.9	18.0	3.9	13.3
Sejs	21.0	12.3	6.5	7.5	6.0	0.1	0.2	0.1	2.0	36.0	1.9	6.4
Sjørslev	15.8	1.5	2.2	12.2	5.4	0.2	0.7	0.0	5.6	14.5	38.8	3.2
Sorring	34.1	2.0	30.8	6.4	4.1	0.3	0.1	0.1	3.4	6.8	5.4	6.5
Thorning	17.1	1.7	2.3	16.4	5.3	0.5	0.5	0.1	3.6	29.1	20.3	3.2
Vinderslev	16.3	1.8	4.0	13.8	5.2	0.1	0.1	0.1	5.5	31.1	18.0	4.0
Voel	45.9	1.6	11.3	4.5	6.9	0.1	0.4	0.1	2.4	18.4	4.5	3.8
Balle	27.5	7.6	9.9	11.6	9.1	0.8	0.5	0.3	3.0	21.6	3.4	4.7
Bryrup	24.0	4.0	5.1	14.6	6.8	0.2	0.2	0.0	4.5	13.2	9.3	18.0
Buskelund	26.5	6.2	15.9	9.4	11.5	0.4	0.6	0.3	2.1	19.0	3.7	4.4
Gjessø	19.6	4.7	8.9	10.1	8.2	0.6	0.3	0.1	4.3	29.5	6.7	7.1
Hjøllund	22.5	2.7	7.6	22.1	5.3	0.0	0.4	0.0	2.3	7.6	10.3	19.1
Langsøskolen	29.9	6.9	9.1	11.8	6.1	0.2	0.8	0.3	4.6	18.6	3.2	8.5
Alderslyst	31.4	5.2	11.3	13.0	7.6	0.2	0.6	0.6	4.2	14.7	3.3	7.9
Jysk Arena	31.3	5.1	11.9	10.2	5.6	0.2	0.5	0.7	4.4	16.0	4.3	9.8
Them	28.3	11.7	4.8	8.0	7.2	0.1	0.4	0.1	4.7	15.2	14.1	5.3
Vestergadehallen	28.3	6.3	11.5	11.2	9.3	0.3	0.7	0.2	3.0	16.3	3.4	9.6
Virklund	27.7	4.3	12.8	14.8	6.7	0.1	0.3	0.0	2.8	21.4	2.6	6.4

== Results ==
Party		Votes	%	+/-	Seats	+/-
Silkeborg Municipality
A	Social Democrats	15,880	27.42	-1.14	10	0
V	Venstre	12,450	21.50	-5.20	7	-1
F	Green Left	6,130	10.58	+3.94	3	+1
C	Conservatives	5,724	9.88	-4.23	3	-3
I	Liberal Alliance	4,330	7.48	+6.20	2	+2
Ø	Red-Green Alliance	4,031	6.96	-0.72	2	0
Æ	Denmark Democrats	3,544	6.12	New	2	New
B	Social Liberals	2,947	5.09	-0.23	1	-1
O	Danish People's Party	2,295	3.96	+1.66	1	+1
M	Moderates	281	0.49	New	0	New
L	Louise Isager	191	0.33	New	0	New
N	Deltagerlisten	110	0.19	-0.17	0	0
Total		57,913	100	N/A	31	N/A
Invalid votes		140	0.18	-0.17		
Blank votes		741	0.93	+0.26		
Turnout		58,794	73.89	+0.56		
Source: valg.dk

== Opinion polls ==
Polling firm	Fieldwork date	Sample size	A	V	C	Ø	F	B	O	I	L	M	N	Æ	Others	Lead
Epinion	4 Sep - 13 Oct 2025	523	27.1	20.5	6.9	8.2	9.7	3.6	5.5	9.2	–	0.8	–	8.4	0.1	6.6
2024 european parliament election	9 Jun 2024		14.5	16.9	9.9	4.4	16.1	6.7	5.8	7.8	–	6.8	–	8.9	–	0.8
2022 general election	1 Nov 2022		25.8	16.9	7.3	3.8	8.2	3.0	1.8	8.6	–	9.4	–	8.4	–	8.9
2021 regional election	16 Nov 2021		23.3	33.9	13.7	6.4	6.1	3.6	2.5	1.5	–	–	–	–	–	10.6
2021 municipal election	16 Nov 2021		28.6 (10)	26.7 (8)	14.1 (6)	7.7 (2)	6.6 (2)	5.3 (2)	2.3 (0)	1.3 (0)	–	–	–	–	–	1.9
