= Kristian Pihl Lorentzen =

Danish politician

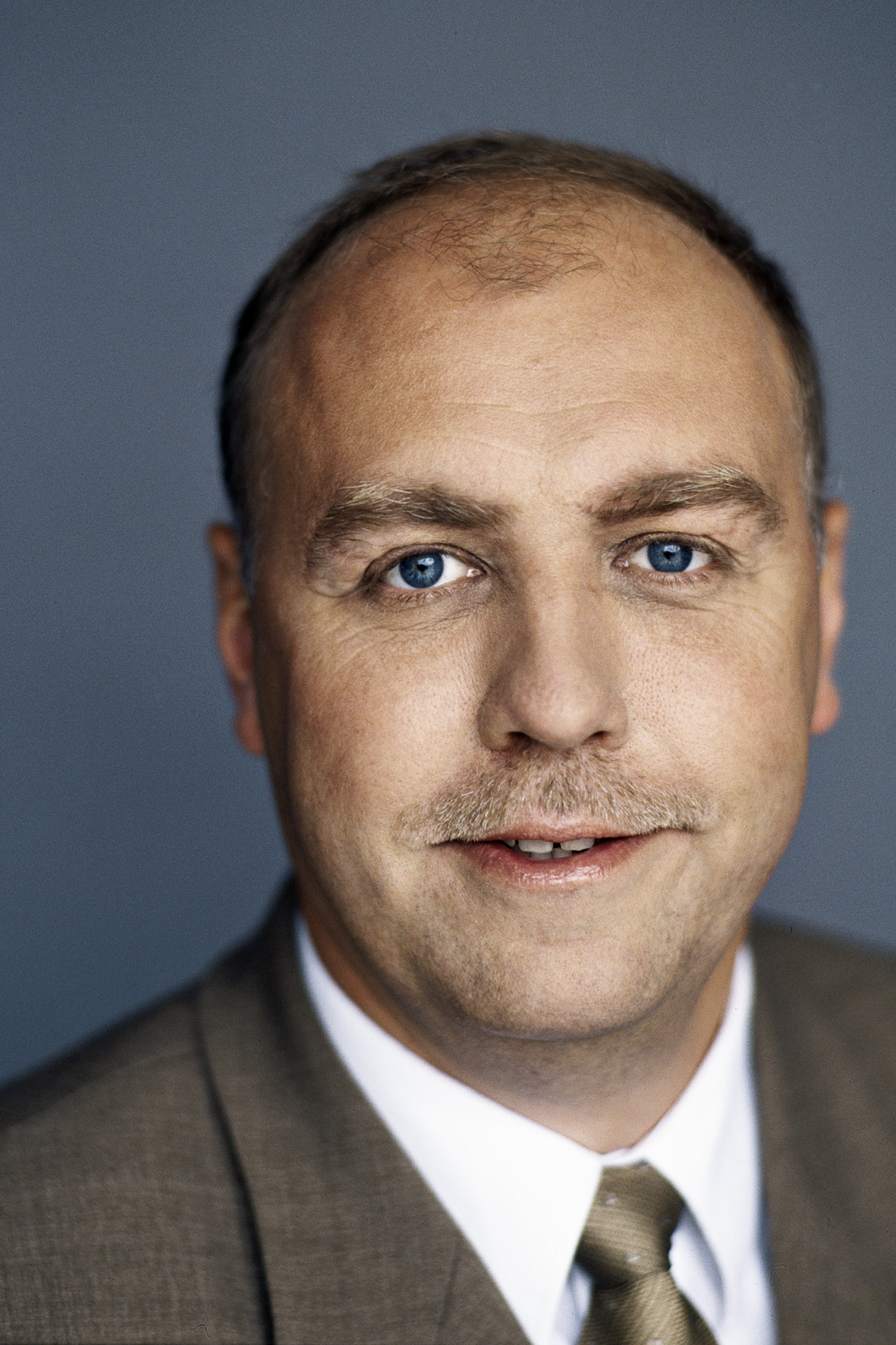
- Portrait of Kristian Pihl Lorentzen

Member of the Folketing
- In office 8 February 2005 – 1 November 2022
- Constituency: West Jutland (from 2007); Viborg (2005—2007)

Personal details
- Born: 19 May 1961 (age 65) Silkeborg, Denmark
- Party: Venstre

Kristian Pihl Lorentzen (born 19 May 1961 in Silkeborg) is a Danish politician and author, who is a former member of the Folketing for the Venstre political party. He was elected into parliament at the 2005 Danish general election.

== Political career ==
Lorentzen sat in the municipal council of Kjellerup Municipality from 1993 to 2006. After 2006 the municipality was merged with Gjern, Silkeborg and Them, municipalities to form the new Silkeborg Municipality.

Lorentzen was first elected into parliament at the 2005 election and was reelected in 2007. He was elected again in 2011, where he received 9,488 personal votes. In 2015 he was reelected with 7,768 votes and in 2019 with 6,963 votes.

== Honours and decorations ==
- Order of the Dannebrog, Knight

== Bibliography ==
- Stop trafikal egoisme (2020, co-author)
- På sporet af Danmark ‒ Jernbanen før, nu og i fremtiden (2013)
- Hvor der er vilje, er der vej ‒ Transportpolitiske visioner for Danmark (2010)
