= Funder Kirkeby =

- Village
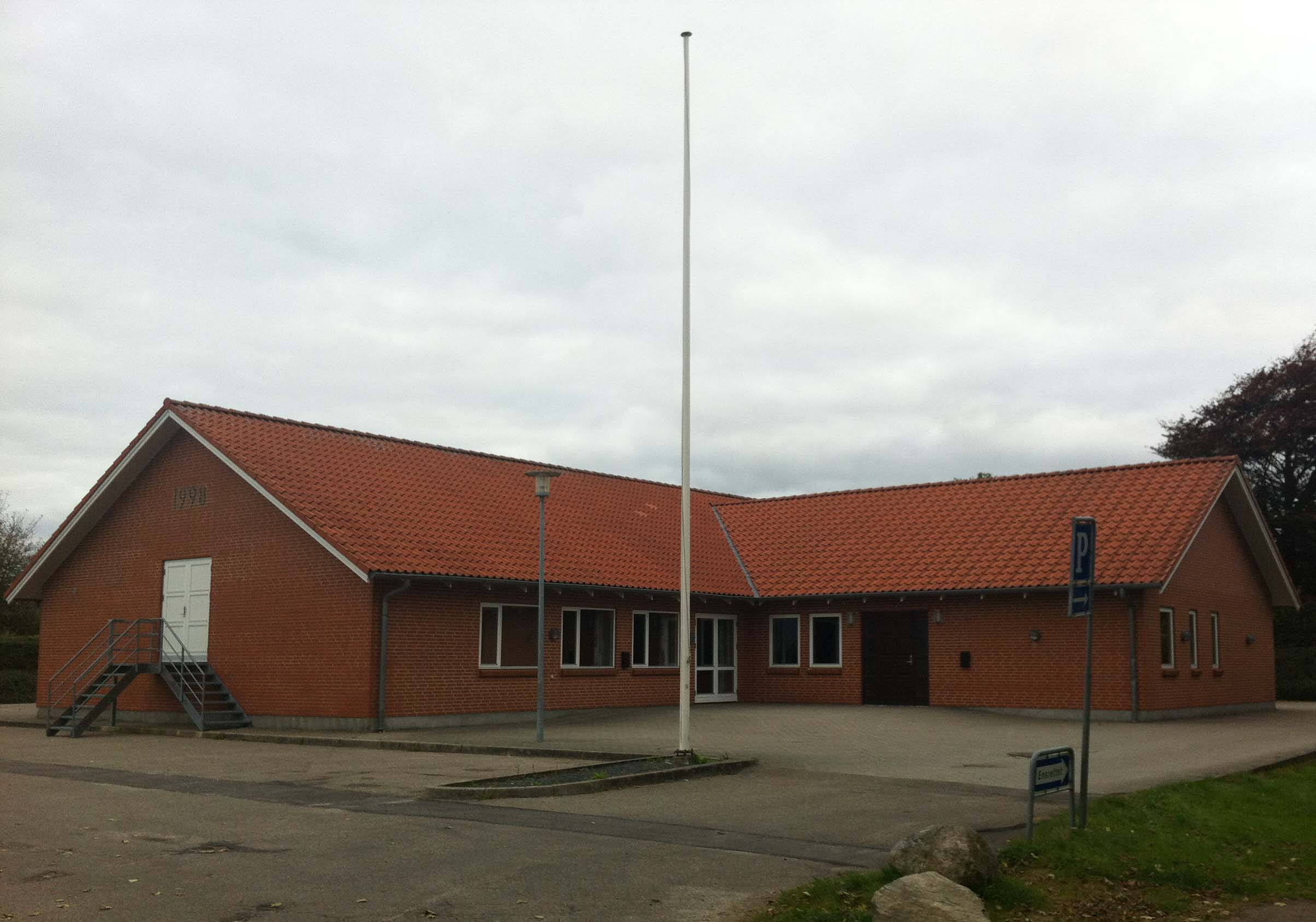
- Funder Kirkeby village hall

- Location within Central Denmark Region Location within Denmark
- Coordinates: 56°9′17″N 9°26′39″E
- Country: Denmark
- Region: Central Denmark (Midtjylland)
- Municipality: Silkeborg Municipality
- Parish: Funder Parish

Population (2026)
  - Total: 618

Funder Kirkeby is a village, with a population of 618 (1 January 2026), in Silkeborg Municipality, Central Denmark Region in Denmark. It is located 5 km southeast of Kragelund, 19 km south of Kjellerup, 9 km east of Pårup and 10 km west of Silkeborg.

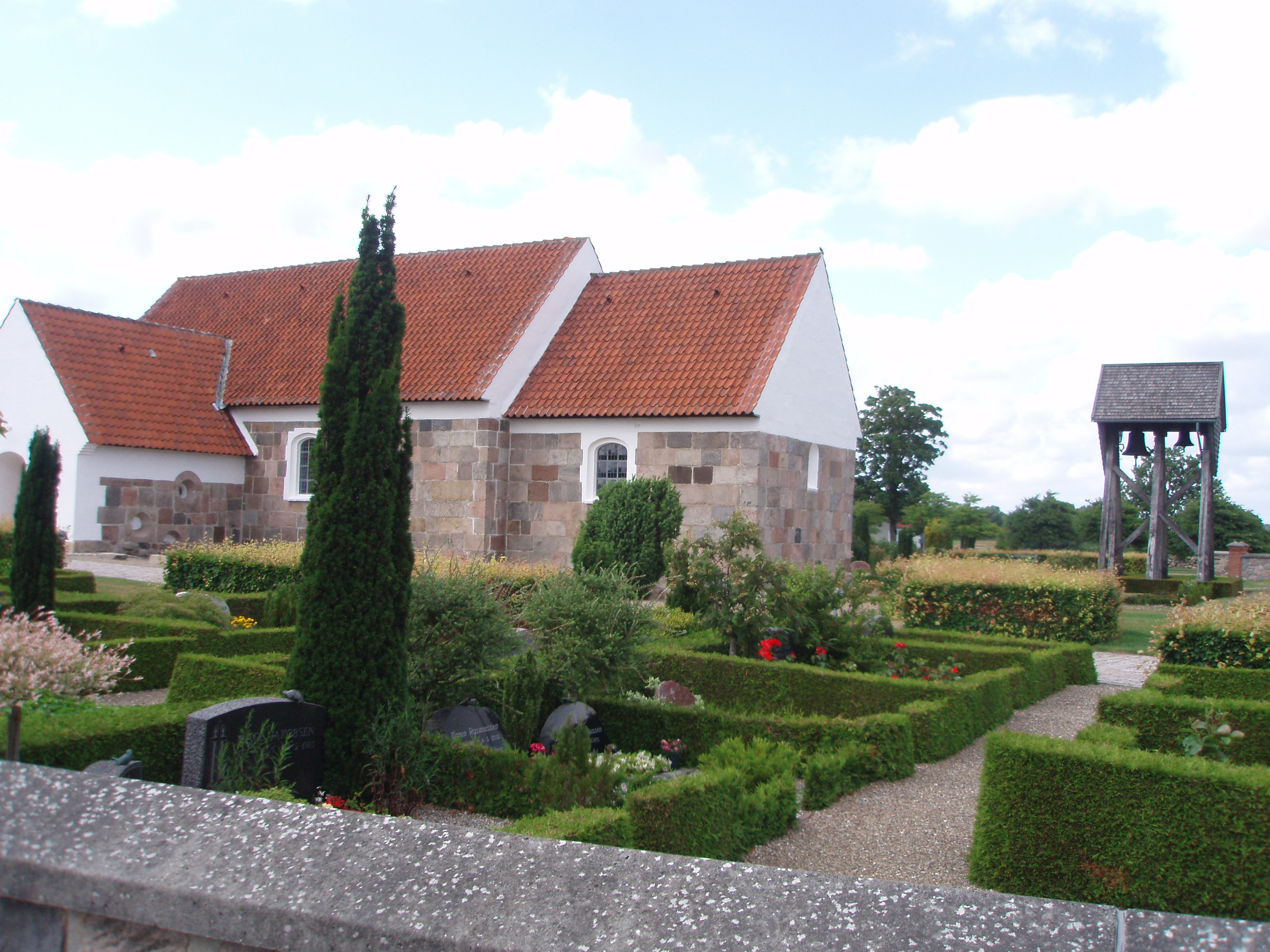
Funder Church in Funder Kirkeby

Funder Church is a towerless ashlar church where both the south and north portal built in Romanesque architectural style remain.
