= Tvilum Priory =

Monastery - Silkeborg, Denmark

Coordinates: 56.2435°N 9.6736°E

Tvilum Priory was a monastery of Augustinian Canons at Tvilum near Gjern and Fårvang, to the north of Silkeborg, Denmark.

== History ==
Tvilum Priory, the latest of the Augustinian monasteries in Denmark, was founded between 1246 and 1249 by Bishop Gunner of Ribe, who had hoped to establish the Augustinians in the cathedral chapter at Ribe, but in vain. After he resigned his bishopric in 1246, he donated all his worldly goods to the monastery at Tvilum, while he himself became a Franciscan friar. The Bishop of Aarhus at about the same time gifted the income of the churches of Gjern and the Ladegård to provide for them. The priory was built on the east bank of the Guden River, at that time an important transportation corridor in central Jutland. The first canons came from Dalby Abbey (or Priory), an Augustinian house in Scania (then in Denmark, now in Sweden).

The monastery was constructed as a two-storey rectangular building consisting of four ranges, of which the church formed the north range. The others included the dormitory, hospital, chapter house, storage, and space for the lay brothers who assisted with the day-to-day work of the monastery. The church was planned as a flat-roofed Romanesque structure but during construction more modern Gothic vaulting was added. It was built out of hand-made bricks. In 1470 the church at Ladegård was demolished, after which the priory church has served also as a parish church up to the present day.

An interesting obligation of the monastery, perhaps in return for royal beneficence, was to provide fresh horses and hounds for royal hunts. The burden became so great that the prior wrote to Christoffer I to complain about the cost of providing the services. The arms of King Valdemar Atterdag were painted on the walls of the church in about 1350 and can still be seen there.

Over time the monastery came into possession of many farms and properties in the area as families donated land in memory of deceased family members, or from the desire to help the church, or as bequests in wills.

== Dissolution ==
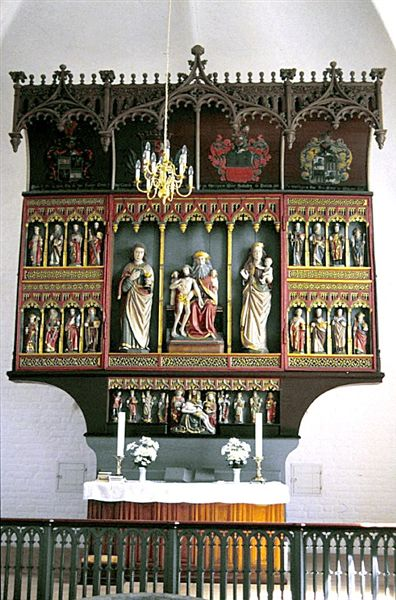
The altarpiece in Tvilum church

The Reformation in Denmark swept Catholic teaching and practice aside as early as 1527, but these far-reaching changes did not reach the isolated hinterlands where Tvilum lay until some time in 1536, when the crown seized all monastic houses and property in Denmark. Tradition says that the Augustinian canons, who were ordained priests, then became Lutheran pastors. All of the monastery holdings were eventually transferred to Skanderborg Castle, which used the farm income to support the expansion and operations of the castle. The monastic buildings were demolished relatively quickly, but Tvilum Church (the priory church) survived because it was the parish church in a very small town. The pre-Reformation crucifix from the monastery was preserved, as was the fine altarpiece carved in the late 15th century.

== Sources ==
- Bondesen, H. (ed).: Nordenskirker.dk efter oplysninger fra bogen Tvilum kirke - restaureringer og udgravninger 1985-95 (incl articles by Christian Fischer, Hans Krongaard Kristensen, Bent Meyer, Henrik Græbe, Mette Kristine Jensen and Knud Bjerring) ISBN 978-87-88016-52-9
- Laurensen, Vilhelm, nd: De Danske Augustinerordensklostrenes bygningshistorie (in Danish)
