= Thorning =

Thorning may refer to:

- Thorning Parish, parish of the Church of Denmark in the Silkeborg Municipality, Denmark.
- Thorning (town), town in the Silkeborg Municipality, Central Denmark Region, Denmark.
- Helle Thorning-Schmidt, Danish politician, Prime Minister of Denmark.
