= Tvilum Parish =

Tvilum Parish Tvilum Sogn
- Parish
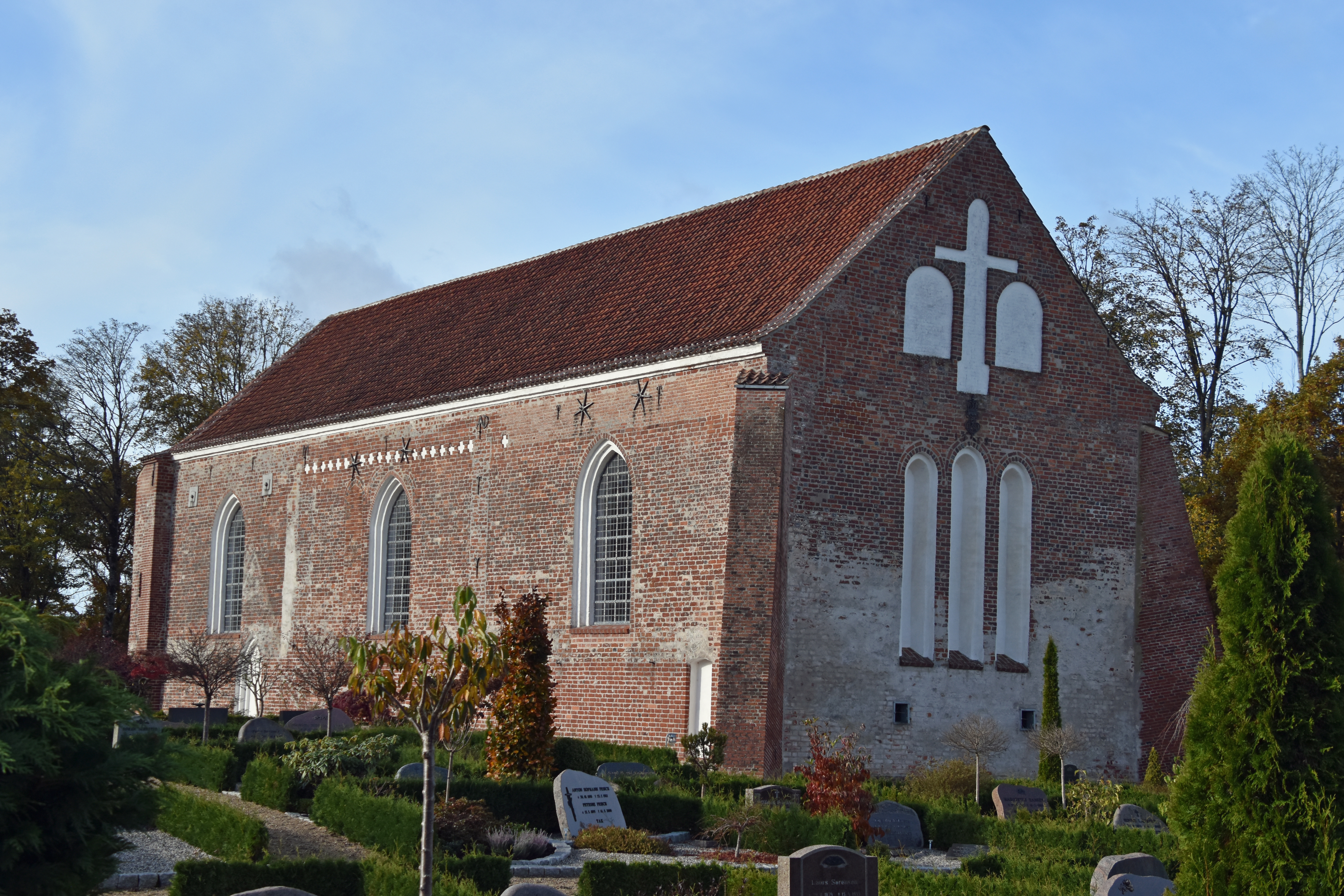
- Tvilum Church
- Interactive map of Tvilum Parish
- Country: Denmark
- Region: Central Denmark (Midtjylland)
- Municipality: Silkeborg
- Diocese: Aarhus

Population (2025)
  - Total: 2,019

Tvilum Parish (Danish: Tvilum Sogn) is a parish in the Diocese of Aarhus in Silkeborg Municipality. The parish contains the town of Fårvang.

The parish church Tvilum Church is solitary located 5 km southwest of Fårvang at the Gudenå. It is the only remaining part of Tvilum Priory, an Augustinian monastery which was founded in 1250.
