= Gjern Municipality =

Former municipality in Denmark

Coordinates: 56.23032°N 9.73883°E

Gjern municipality was a municipality (Danish, kommune) in Aarhus County in the eastern part of the Jutland peninsula in central Denmark. The municipality covered an area of 144 km^{2}, and had a total population of 8.134 (2005). Its last mayor was Ella Porskær, a member of the Venstre (Liberal Party) political party. The site of its municipal council was the town of Gjern. Other towns in the municipalities were Fårvang, Grauballe, Sorring, and Voel.

Gjern municipality ceased to exist as the result of Kommunalreformen ("The Municipality Reform" of 2007). It was merged with existing Kjellerup, Silkeborg and Them municipalities to form the new Silkeborg municipality. This created a municipality with an area of 857 km^{2} and a total population of 84,167 (2005). The new municipality belongs to Region Midtjylland ("Mid-Jutland Region").
