= Thorning Parish =

Parish in Silkeborg Municipality, Denmark

Thorning Parish Thorning Sogn
- Parish
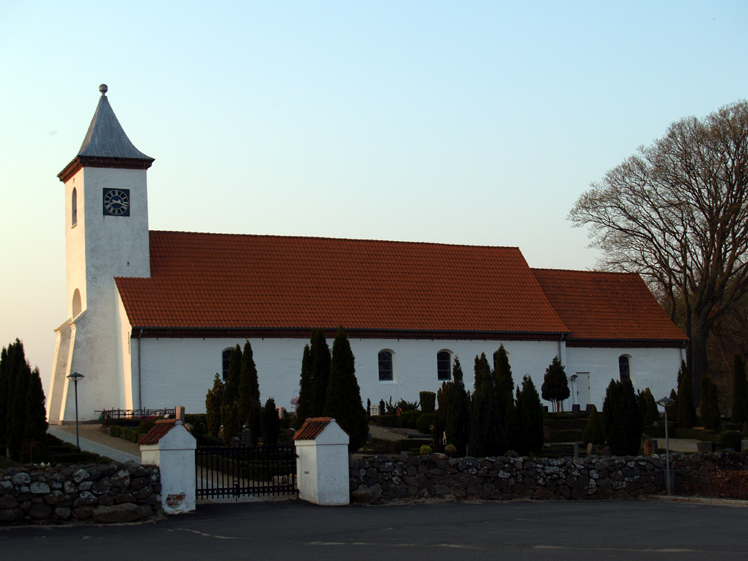
- Thorning Church
- Interactive map of Thorning Parish
- Coordinates: 56°17′11″N 9°20′03″E
- Country: Denmark
- Region: Central Denmark
- Municipality: Silkeborg Municipality
- Diocese: Diocese of Viborg

Population (2025)
  - Total: 2,038
- Parish number: 8601

Thorning Parish is a parish in the Diocese of Viborg, in Silkeborg Municipality, in Denmark. Until the 2007 Danish Municipal Reform, it was a part of Kjellerup Municipality, in Aarhus County.

The following settlements and localities are found within Thorning Parish:

- Bækgårdsmark
  - Kong Knaps Dige
- Bøgild
- Gammel Frederiksmose
- Grønbjerg
- Gråe
- Grågårde
- Gråhede
- Gråmose
- Gråskov
- Impgårde
- Knudstrup Hede
- Kompedal Plantage
- Malling Huse
- Neder Kærsholm
- Nipgård Sø
- Nørhede
- Nørre Knudstrup
- Oddermark
- Oustrup
  - Oustruplund
- Over Kærsholm
- Ravnholt
- Ravnholt Hede
- Skræ
- Stenrøgel
- Sønder Knudstrup
- Thorning
- Thorning Nørremark
- Thorning Overby
- Thorning Vestermark
- Thorningskov
- Ulvedal Plantage
- Ungstrup
- Vattrup
