= Nitten =

Nitten may refer to:

- Nitten, the colloquial name for the town of Newtongrange, Midlothian, Scotland
- Nitten, the shortened name for Japan Fine Arts Exhibition
- "Nitten", a 2009 song by Danish singer Thomas Holm
