= Sejling =

- Village
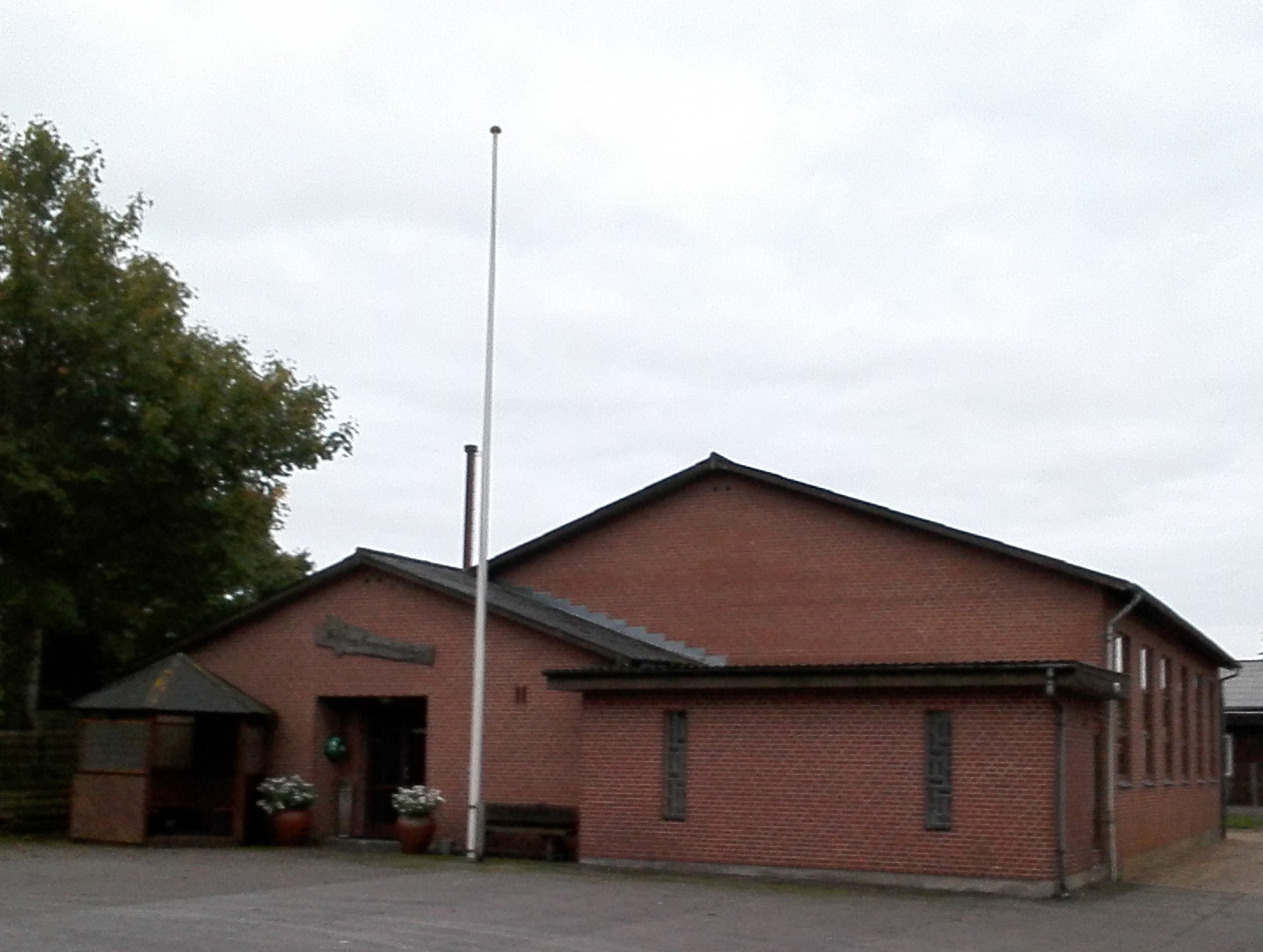
- The village hall in Sejling

- Location within Central Denmark Region Location within Denmark
- Coordinates: 56°13′3″N 9°31′8″E
- Country: Denmark
- Region: Central Denmark (Midtjylland)
- Municipality: Silkeborg Municipality

Population (2026)
  - Total: 583

Sejling is a village, with a population of 583 (1 January 2026), in Silkeborg Municipality, Central Denmark Region in Denmark. It is located 11 km southeast of Kjellerup and 6 km northwest of Silkeborg.

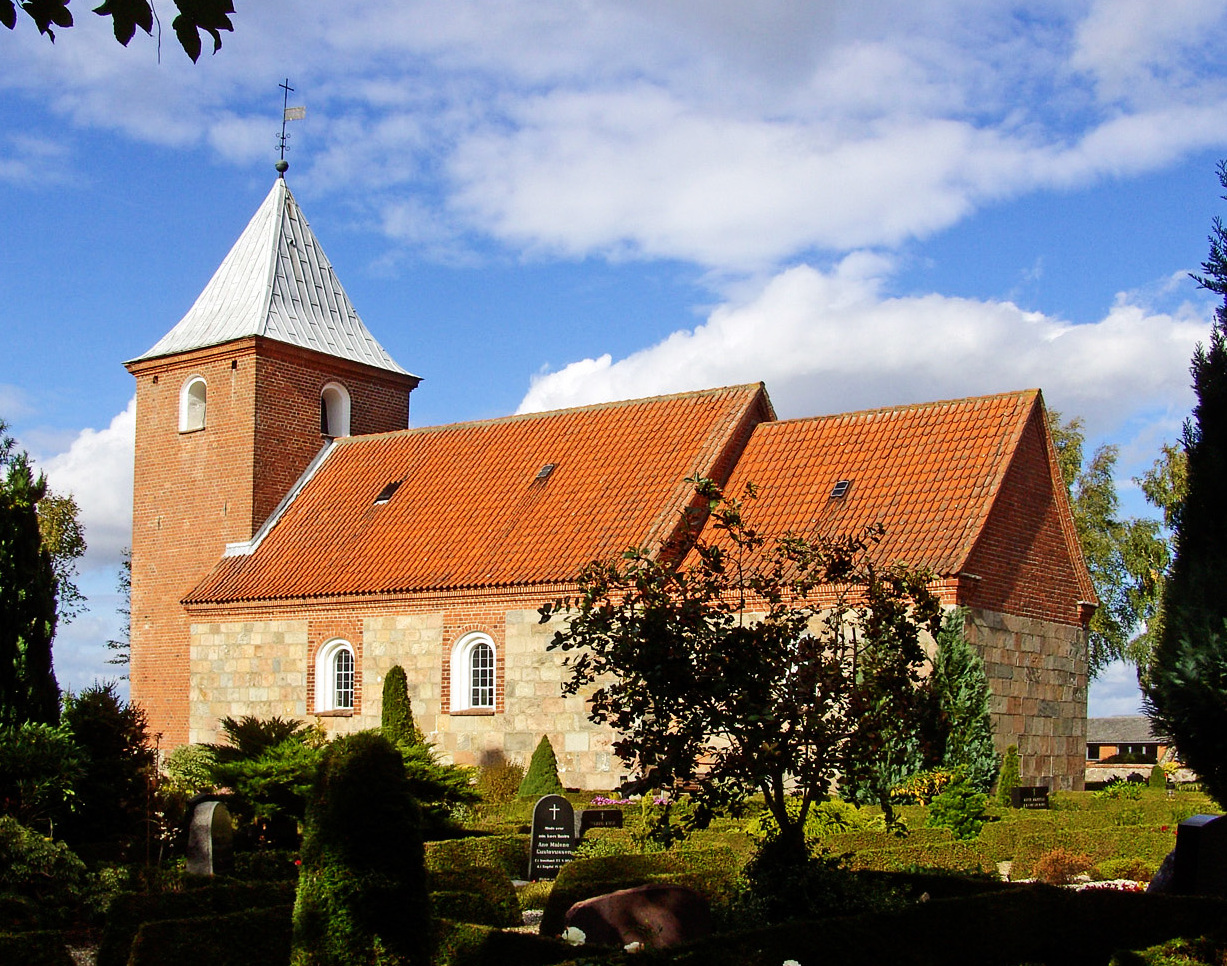
Sejling Church

Sejling Church is located in the village.
