= Simon Trier =

Danish footballer (born 1998)

Personal information
- Full name: Simon Trier Jakobsen
- Date of birth: 6 July 1998 (age 28)
- Place of birth: Gjessø‚ Denmark
- Height: 1.83 m (6 ft 0 in)
- Position: Centre-back

Team information
- Current team: VSK Aarhus
- Number: 27

Youth career
- Horsens
- Viborg

Senior career*
Years	Team	Apps	(Gls)
2017–2020	Viborg	16	(1)
2020–2022	Kolding	62	(3)
2022	Thisted	12	(0)
2023	Kolding	27	(1)
2024–2026	Middelfart	28	(2)
2026–	VSK Aarhus	0	(0)

International career
2019	Denmark U-20	2	(0)
- * Club domestic league appearances and goals as of 3 October 2026

Simon Trier Jakobsen (born 6 July 1998) is a Danish professional footballer who plays as a centre-back for VSK Aarhus.

== Club career ==
=== Viborg FF ===
Born in Gjessø, Trier joined Viborg FF from AC Horsens at his first year as a U17 player. In the 2016–17 season, Trier was on the bench two times for the first team squad in the Danish Superliga and one time in the Danish Cup. He was then promoted permanently into the first team squad from the beginning of the 2017–18 season.

On 30 July 2017, Trier got his debut for Viborg FF. Trier started on the left back but was substituted in the 72nd minute due to an injury. He was afterwards sidelined for one month with a groin injury. Trier managed to play nine games for the first team in his first season as a senior player.

In April 2018, Trier got his contract extended until June 2019. On 1 June 2019, his contract was extended once again, this time with three-years. A few days later, he was also called up by the Danish U-20 nation team.

=== Kolding IF ===
On 9 January 2020, Kolding IF announced that Trier had joined the club on a contract until the summer 2022. Trier got his debut for the club on 29 February 2020 against Næstved BK, playing all 90 minutes.

=== Later career ===
On 16 August 2022, Trier signed with Thisted FC. However, four months later, ahead of 2023, Trier returned to Kolding IF.

In January 2024, Trier joined Danish 2nd Division side Middelfart Boldklub on a deal until June 2025.
