= Svend-Allan Sørensen =

Danish conceptual artist (born 1975)

Svend-Allan Sørensen (born 1975) is a conceptual artist from Kjellerup, Denmark.

He studied at Funen Art Academy from 1997 to 2002. His first separate exhibition was at Funen's Art Museum in 2002. Sorø Art Museum, Vendsyssel Kunstmuseum, Galleri Specta, Johannes Larsen Museet, Overgaden. Institut for Samtidskunst and other places. He has designed book covers for two of Lone Hørslev's books.

Much of his art relates to nature and several exhibitions have prominently figured birds.

He founded the one-man publishing house Adressens Forlag.

== Publications ==
- Trøjen af - trøjen på. Adressen Forlag. (1999)
- Country og Koncept (2013)
