= Thomas Holm (musician) =

Danish singer-songwriter (born 1978)

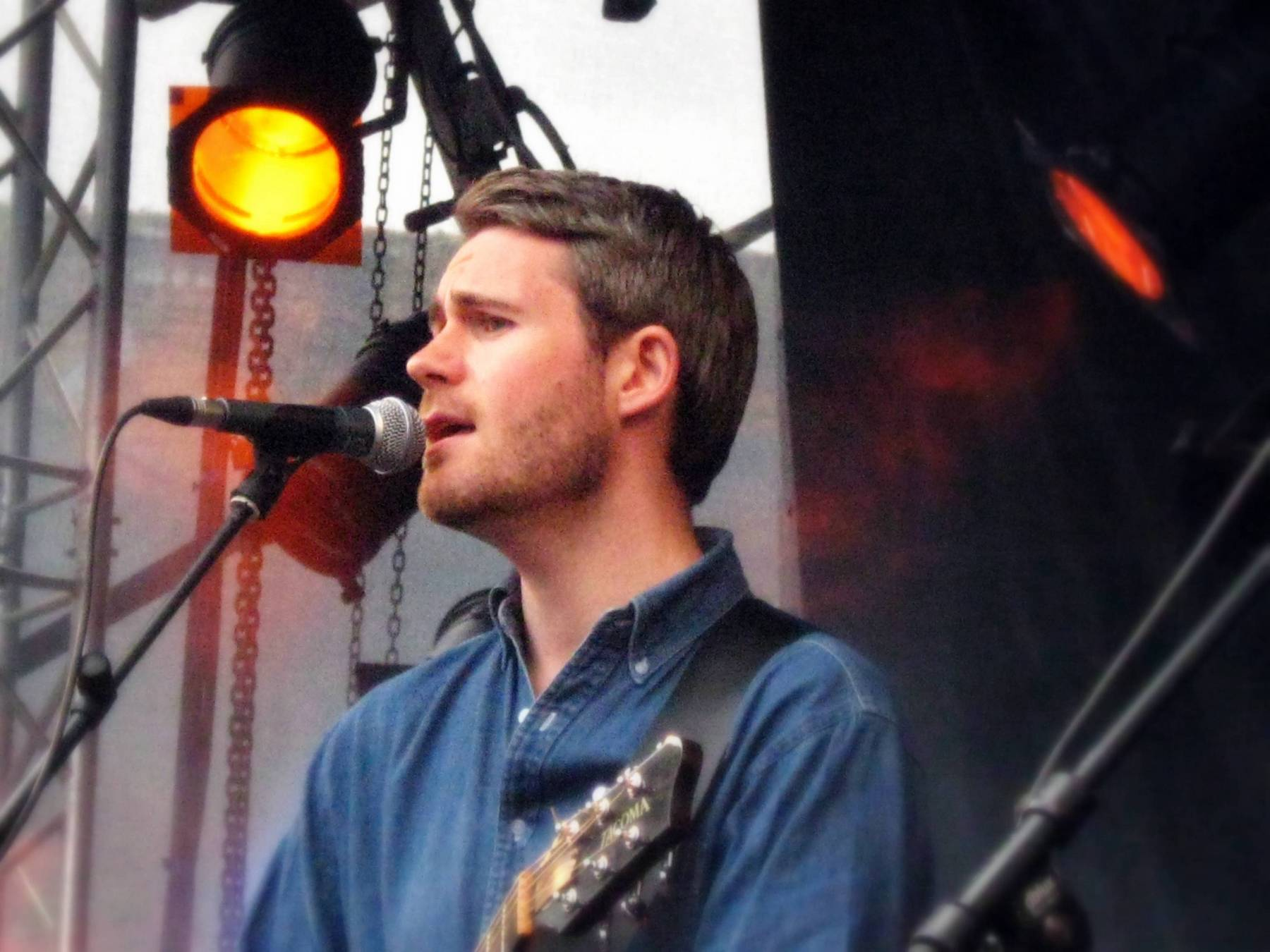
- Thomas Holm in September 2010

Background information
- Born: Kjellerup, Denmark 1978
- Origin: Copenhagen, Denmark
- Genres: pop
- Occupation: Singer-songwriter
- Instrument(s): Vocals, piano, guitar
- Years active: 2009–present
- Labels: Copenhagen Records, Universal Music
- Website: www.facebook.com/thomasholmdk/

Thomas Holm (born 1978) is a Danish singer-songwriter.

Holm was born and raised in Kjellerup and was a graduate student in Political Science at the University of Copenhagen when he began his musical career.

He debuted with the single "Nitten" (The Short Straw) in 2009 and was also involved in the single "Skrøbeligt fundament (Fragile Foundation)" in support of the 2010 earthquake in Haiti. On the album "En hyldest til Sebastian (A Tribute to Sebastian)", he sings a reinterpretation of "80'ernes Boheme (80s Bohemian)", which was first published in 1983.

His debut album "Middelklassehelt (Middle Class Hero)", produced by Henrik Balling, was published by Copenhagen Records in April 2010. The single, "Ikea", was released in September 2010.

Thomas Holm is boyfriend of singer Fallulah.

== Discography ==
=== Studio albums ===
- Middelklassehelt (2010)

=== Singles ===
- Nitten (2009)
- Selvmord På Dansegulvet (2010)
- Ikea (2010)
- Lidt For Lidt (2010)
- En Stivnet Smiler (Promo) (2010)
- Knep Smerten Væk (2011)
- Byen Kalder (2012)
- Jul, For Helvede (2015)

==== As a Guest Artist ====
- 80'ernes Boheme (80s Bohemian) (2009)
- Skrøbeligt fundament (Fragile Foundation) (2010)
