= Hjøllund =

Coordinates: 56°04′N 9°23′E

- Village
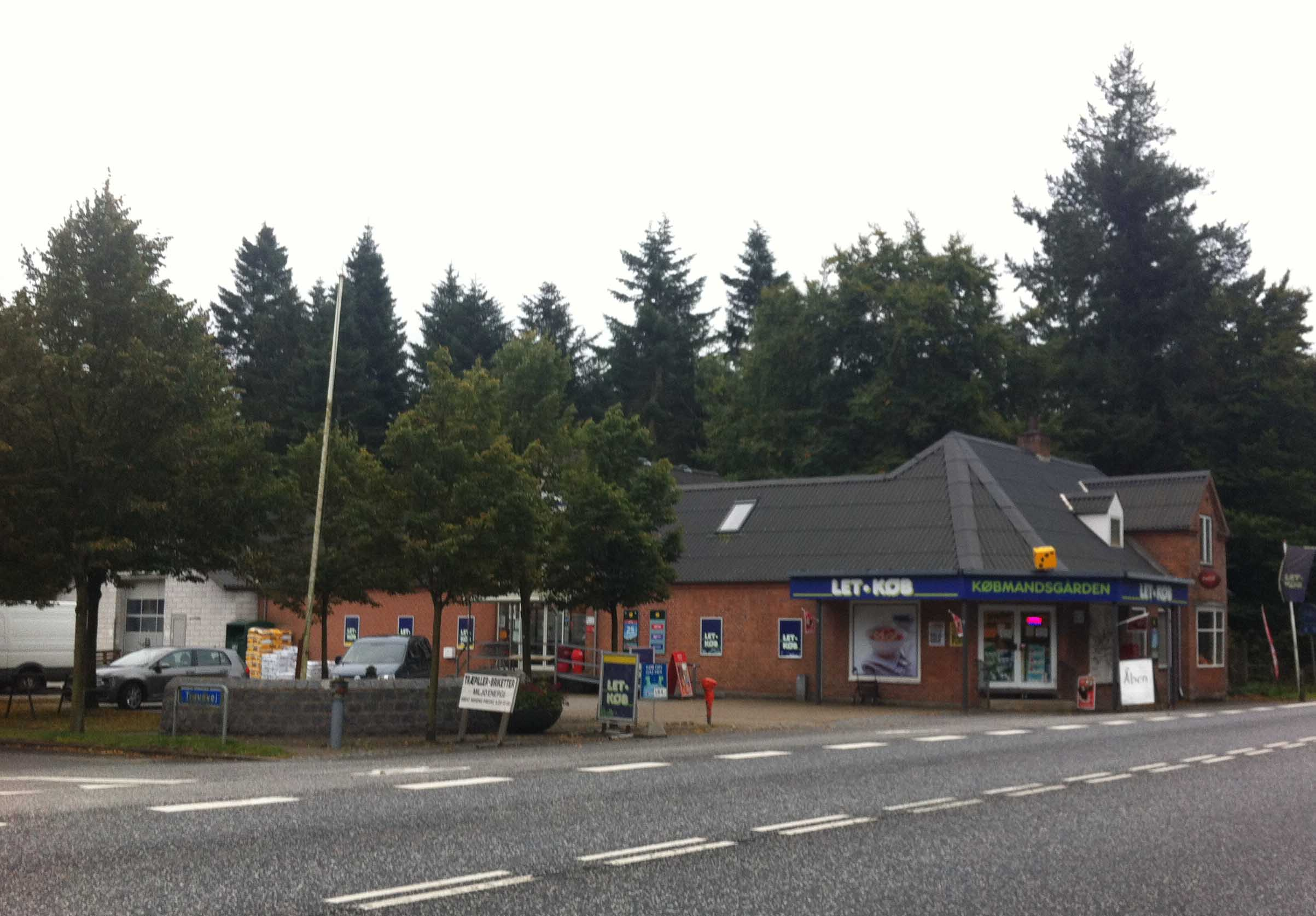
- Hjøllund Convenience Store
- Interactive map of Hjøllund
- Country: Denmark
- Region: Region Midtjylland
- Municipality: Silkeborg Kommune

Hjøllund is a village in Denmark, 18 km southwest of Silkeborg. It is part of Silkeborg Kommune in Region Midtjylland.

The village has been in significant decline as a result of urbanization. In 2011, every fifth house was vacant in Hjøllund, though a convenience store remains open. The village has become increasingly reliant upon neighboring communities and has begun outsourcing its water from the village of Hampen. A proposed highway that would run nearby may revitalize the village in the future.

== History ==
On September 16, 1913, a labor colony named Godrum was opened by the Arbejde Adler Organization. By 1917, the colony had expanded to 12 buildings with room for 40 men. The so-called "colonists" were largely employed in forestry. In 2009, there was a fire at the facility's hay barn. Godrum remained open as a "welfare home" until 2016.

Hjøllund had a train station on the railroad Diagonalbanen from 1920 until 1971. After the station's closure, freight traffic between Brande and Hjøllund continued until 1989. In 1992, the railway was handed over to the Danish Nature Agency, which then established the Funder-Ejstrup nature trail. The former station's building is located at 2 Viborg Hovedvej.

During the second world war, German occupants constructed a weapons depot near the railway. The depot was one of their largest in Denmark and was known as ”Feldluftmunitionslager 6/XI” and ”Christianshede Ammunitions Depot”. Allegedly, the German occupants called the region "Christianshede" because "Hjøllund" was difficult to pronounce. In 1945, the facilities were repurposed as Kærshovedgård prison. The area also housed a camp for German refugees.

Hærvejskroen, a former inn in Hjøllund, was at one time popular but has since foreclosed multiple times. Since 2016, a gravel quarry has been excavated east of the village to the frustration of locals.

== Gallery ==
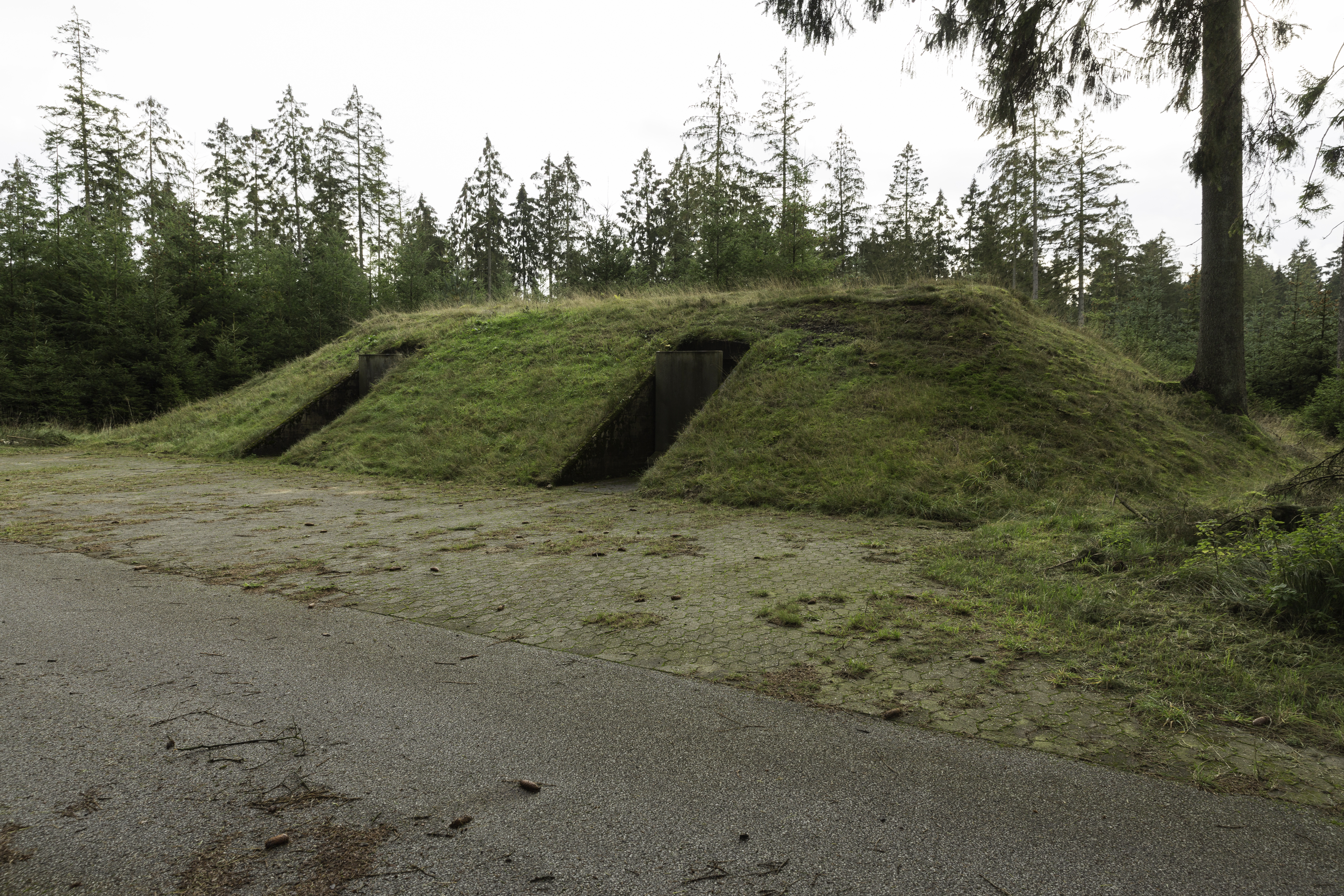
Bunker at the weapons depot

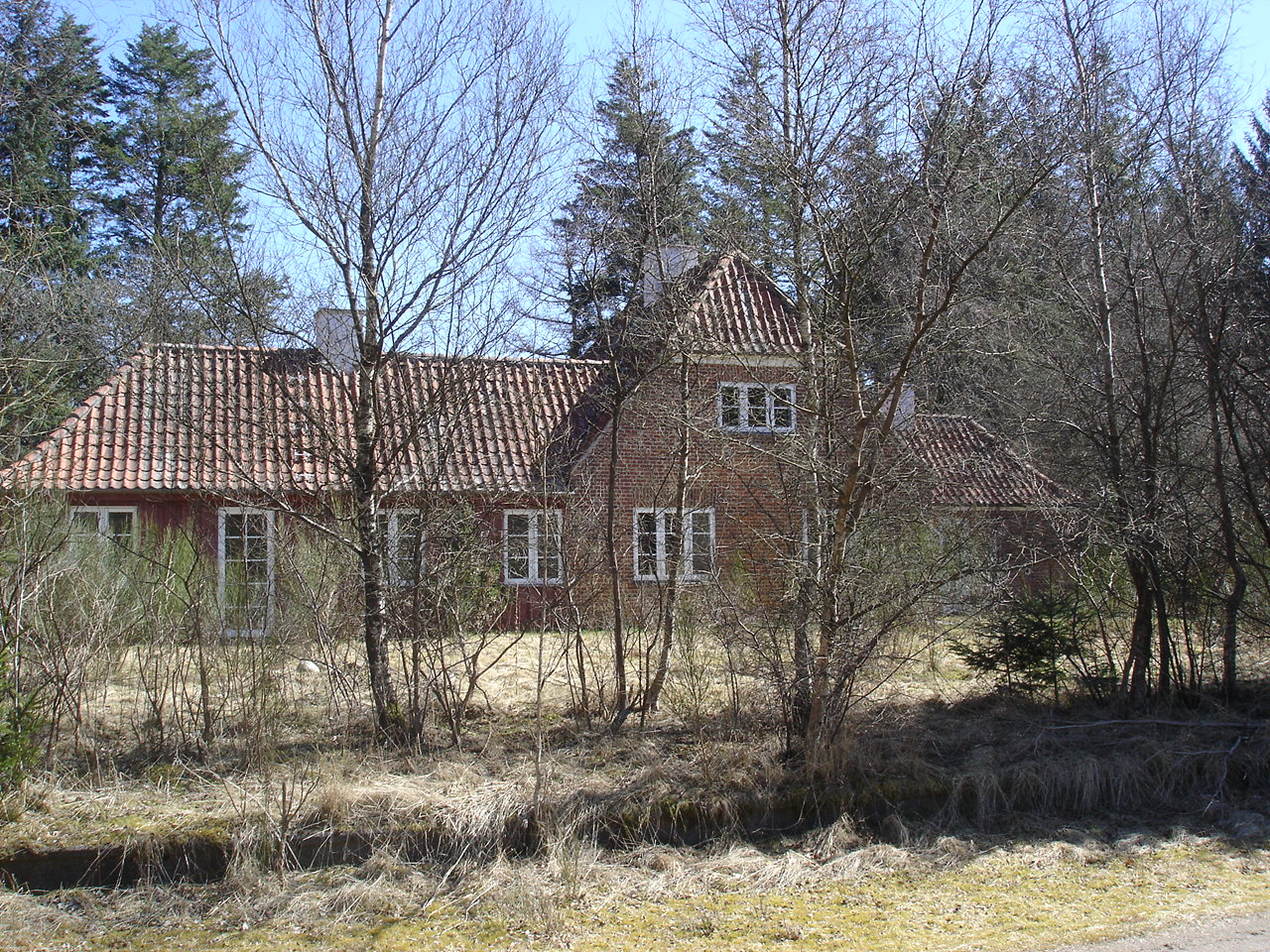
Hjøllund Station

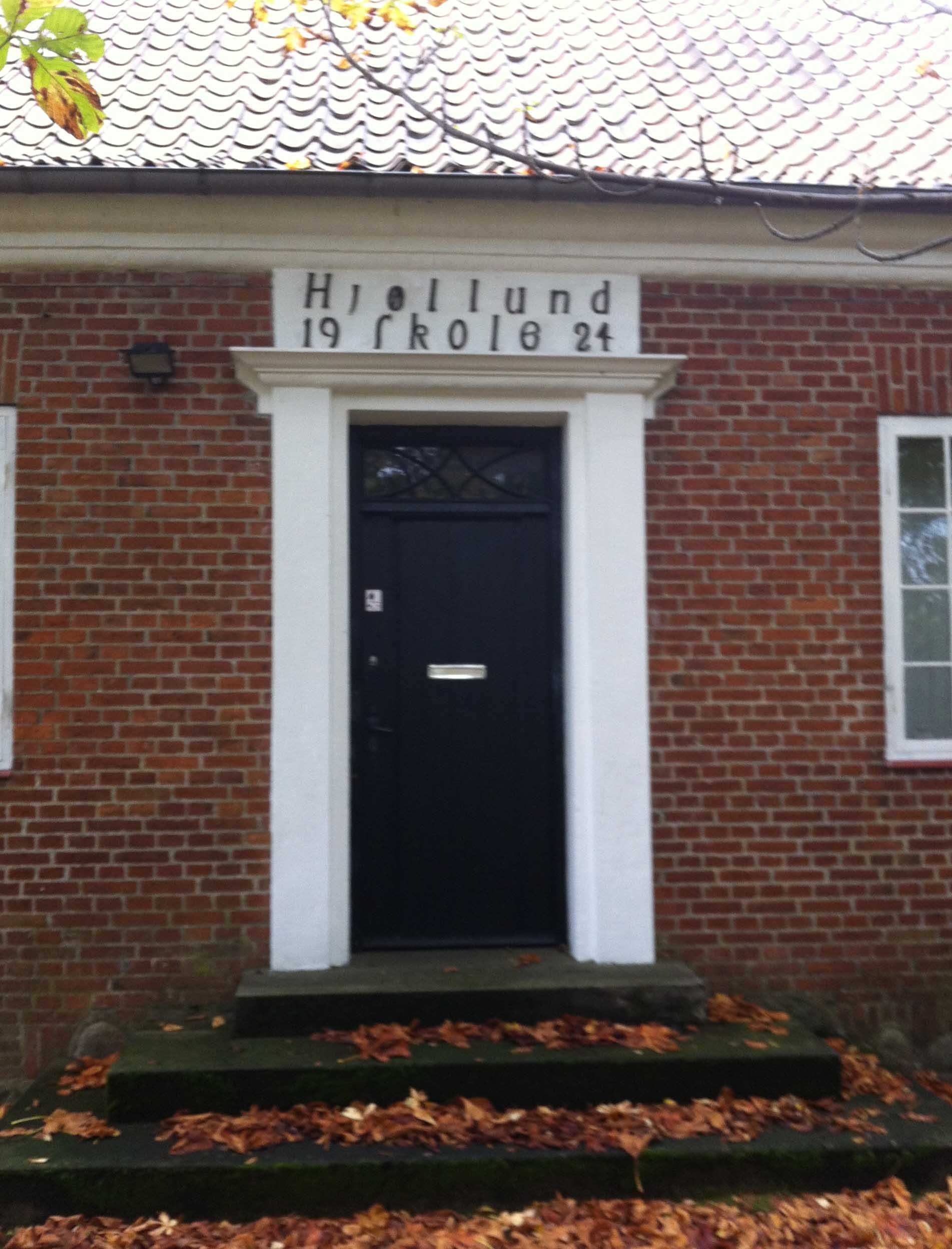
Hjøllund School, inscription reads "Hjøllund Skole 1924"
