= Linå =

- Village
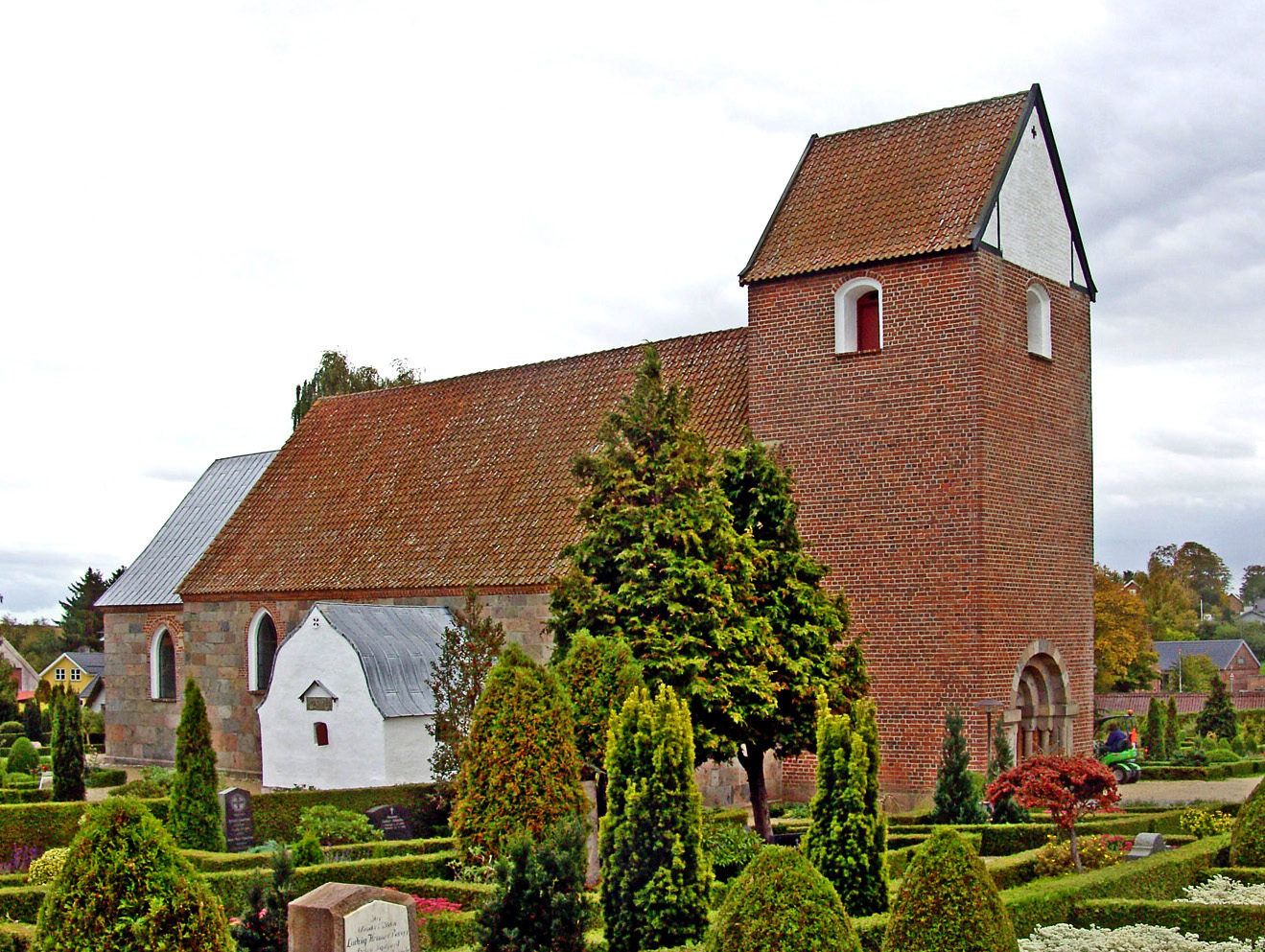
- Linå Church

- Location in Central Denmark Region Linå (Denmark)
- Coordinates: 56°9′15″N 9°41′25″E
- Country: Denmark
- Region: Central Denmark (Midtjylland)
- Municipality: Silkeborg Municipality

Population (2026)
  - Total: 544

Linå is a village, with a population of 544 (1 January 2026), in Silkeborg Municipality, Central Denmark Region in Denmark. It is located 10 km east of Silkeborg and 34 km west of Aarhus

Linå Church is located in the village.
