= Gjessø =

- Town
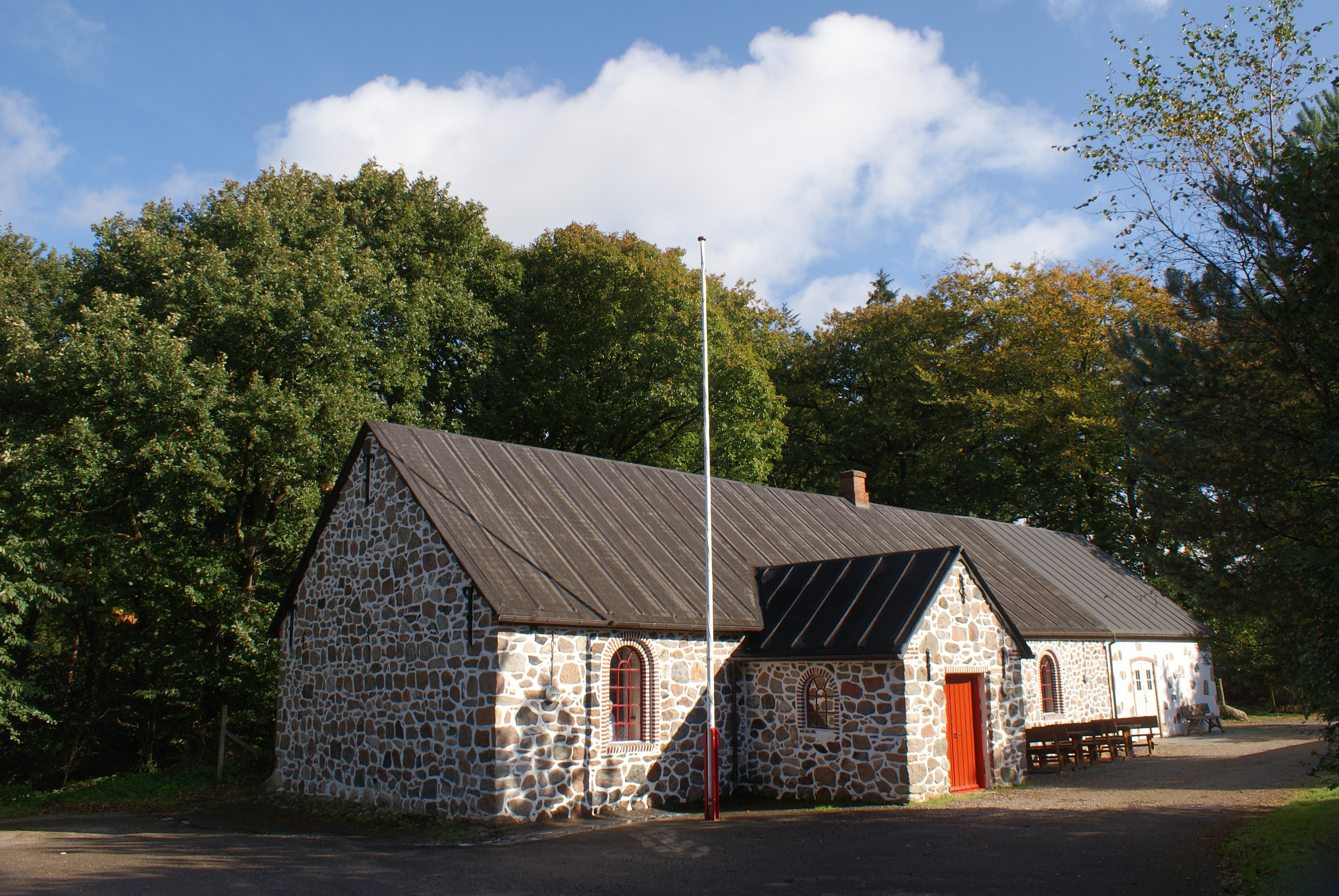
- Gjessø Assembly House in 2011

- Location in Central Denmark Region Gjessø (Denmark)
- Coordinates: 56.11603°N 9.49411°E
- Country: Denmark
- Region: Central Denmark
- Municipality: Silkeborg Municipality

Population (2026)
  - Total: 870
- Time zone: UTC+1 (CET)
  - Summer (DST): UTC+2 (CEST)
- Postal code: DK-8600 Silkeborg

Gjessø is a small town near Silkeborg in Denmark with a population of 870 (1 January 2026).

Gjessø is famous for its lake which fills half of the town. It is used every year by tourists and natives.

== Notable people ==
- Simon Trier (born 1998 in Gjessø) a Danish professional footballer who plays as a left back for Kolding IF
