= Them Municipality =

Former municipality in Denmark

Coordinates: 56°06′N 9°33′E

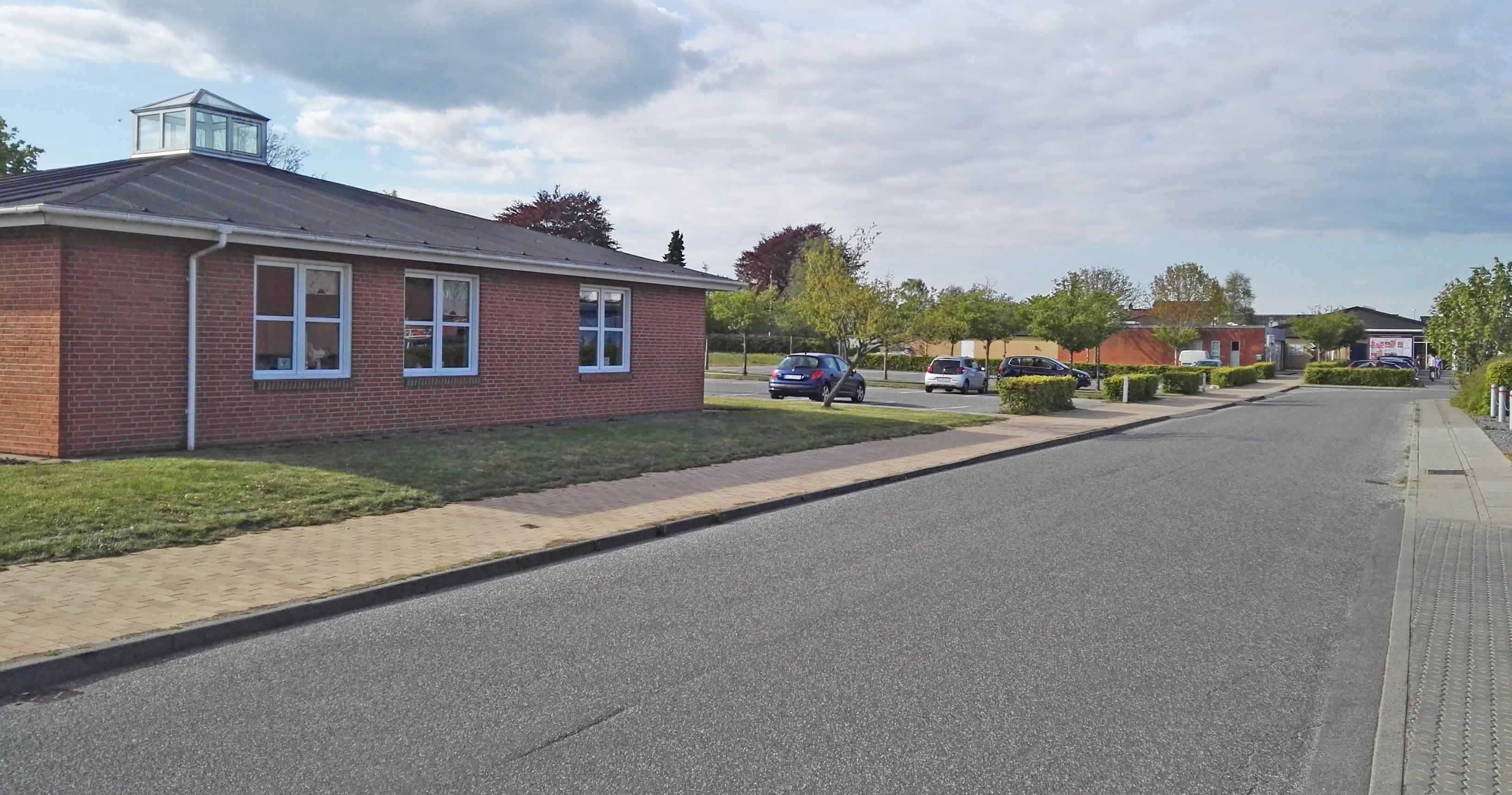
Former location of the Them municipality town hall, 2019

Them municipality was a municipality (Danish, kommune) in the former Aarhus County on the Jutland peninsula in central Denmark. The municipality covered an area of 210 km^{2}, and had a total population of 7,000 (2005). Its last mayor was Torben Hansen, a member of the Socialist People's Party (Socialistisk Folkeparti) political party. The main town and the site of its municipal council was the town of Them.

The municipality was created in 1970 as the result of a kommunalreform ("Municipality Reform") that merged a number of existing parishes:

- Bryrup Parish
- Them Parish
- Vinding Parish
- Vrads Parish

Them municipality ceased to exist as the result of Kommunalreformen ("The Municipality Reform" of 2007). It was merged with Gjern, Kjellerup, and Silkeborg municipalities to form the new Silkeborg municipality. This created a municipality with an area of 857 km^{2} and a total population of 84,167 (2005). The new municipality belongs to Region Midtjylland ("Mid-Jutland Region").
