= Kragelund =

- Village
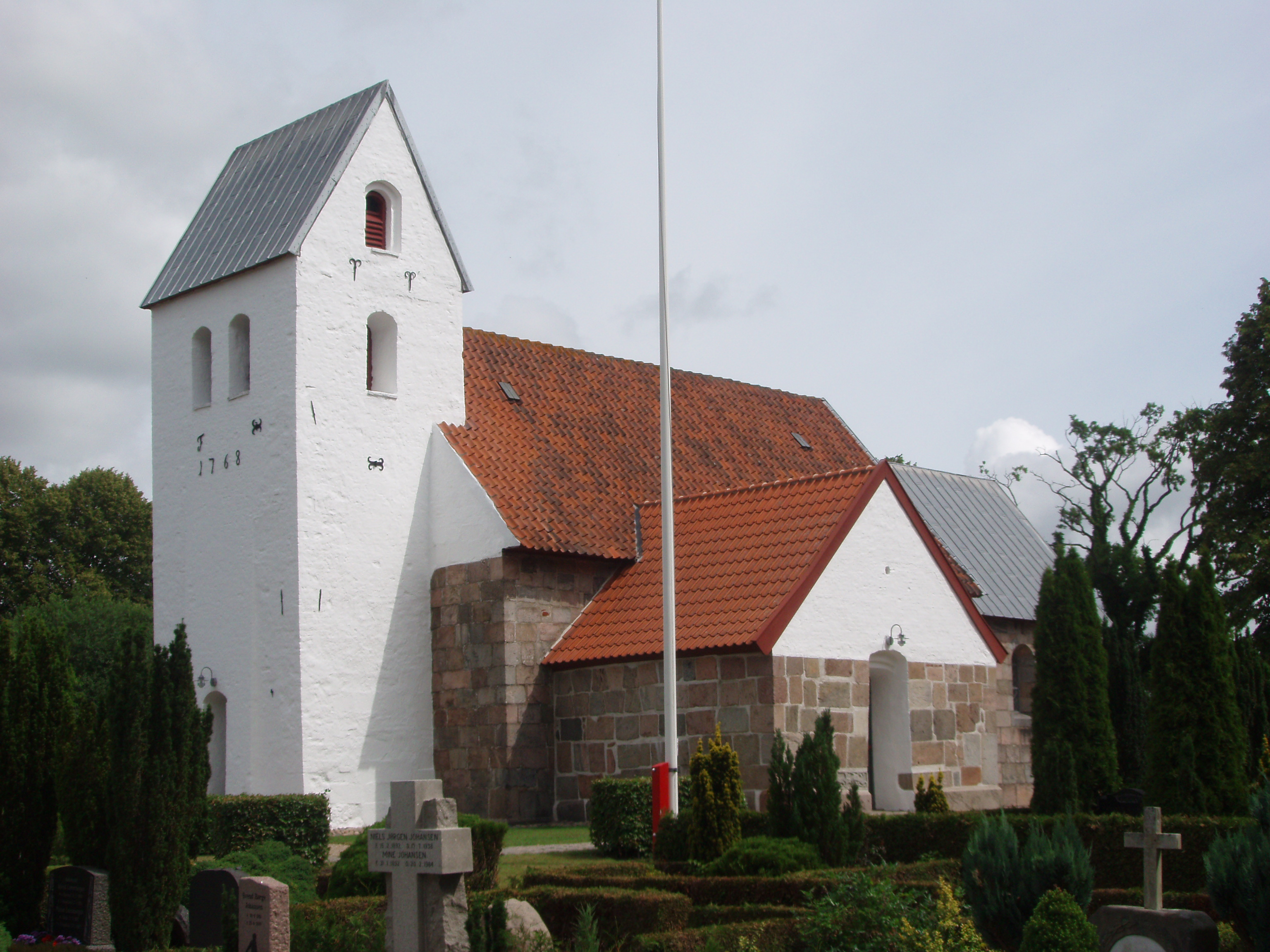
- Kragelund Church

- Location within Central Denmark Region Location within Denmark
- Coordinates: 56°11′41″N 9°24′28″E
- Country: Denmark
- Region: Central Denmark (Midtjylland)
- Municipality: Silkeborg Municipality

Population (2026)
  - Total: 792

Kragelund is a village, with a population of 792 (1 January 2026), in Silkeborg Municipality, Central Denmark Region in Denmark. It is located 10 km west of Silkeborg and 6 km northeast of Engesvang.

Kragelund Church is located in the village.
