= Them, Denmark =

Them
- Town
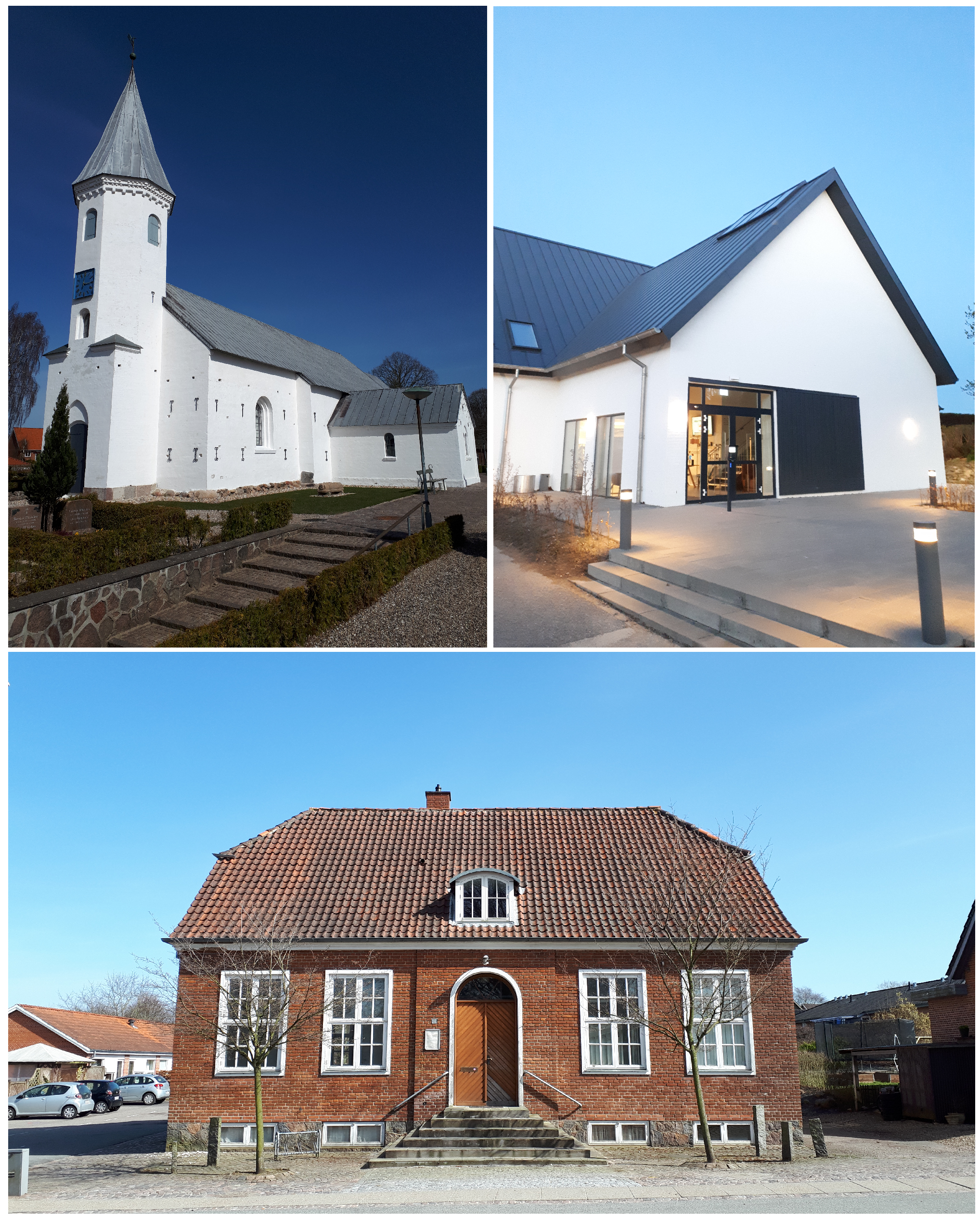

- Location in Denmark Them (Central Denmark Region)
- Coordinates: 56°5′30″N 9°32′54″E
- Country: Denmark
- Region: Central Denmark
- Municipality: Silkeborg Municipality

Area
  - Urban: 1.5 km^{2} (0.58 sq mi)

Population (2026)
  - Urban: 2,477
  - Urban density: 1,700/km^{2} (4,300/sq mi)
- Time zone: UTC+1 (CET)
  - Summer (DST): UTC+2 (CEST)
- Postal code: DK-8653 Them

Them is a small town in central Denmark located in Silkeborg Municipality (formerly Them Municipality) in Jutland, lying a few kilometers south-west of Silkeborg, and north-east of Bryrup. It has a population of 2,477 as of 1 January 2026.

== Business ==
Them is known for the dairy "Them Andelsmejeri" established in 1888.

Trike manufacturer Winther is also based here, and is still a family company.
