= Kjellerup Municipality =

Former municipality in Denmark

Coordinates: 56°17′5″N 9°25′59″E

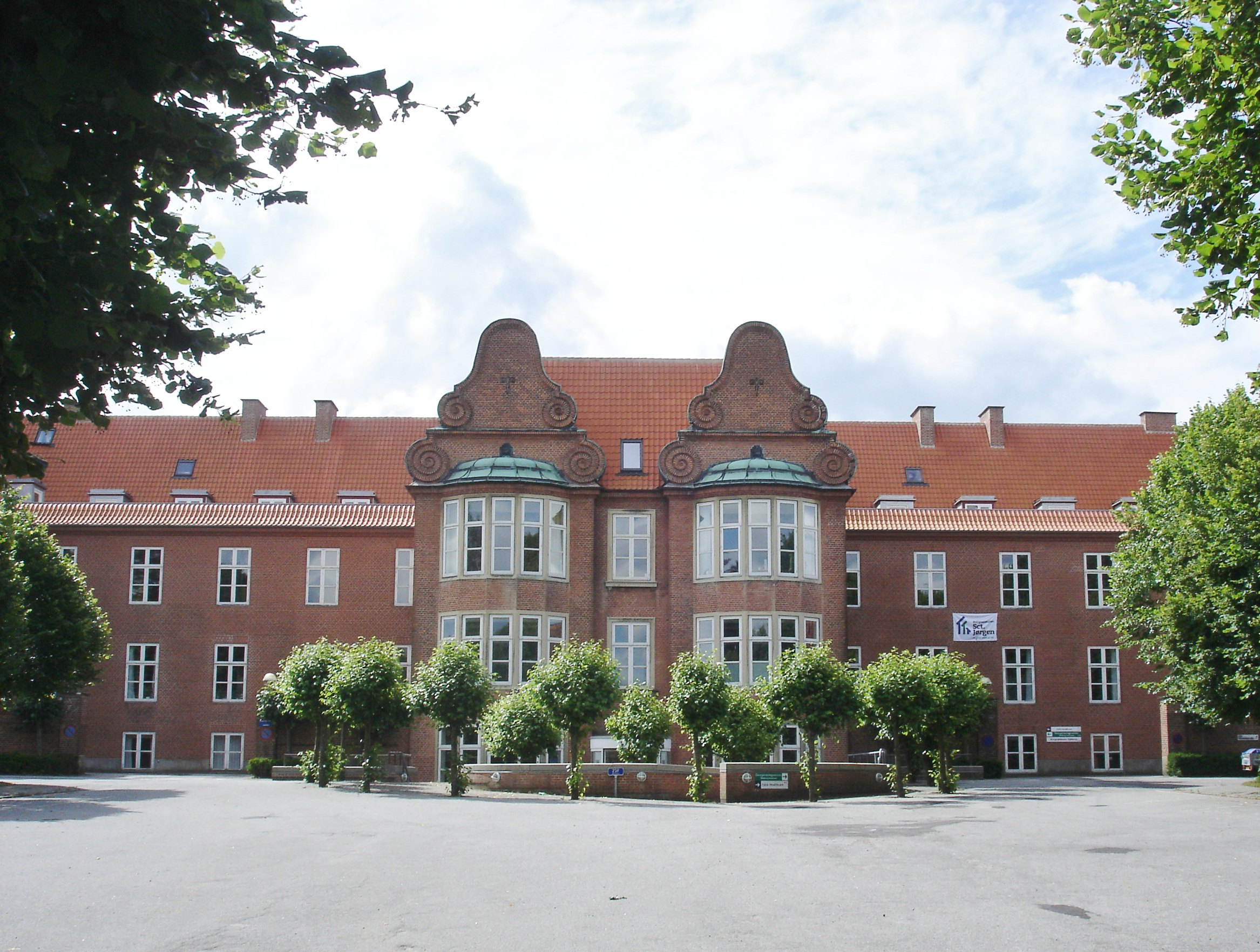

Kjellerup municipality was a municipality (Danish, kommune) in Aarhus County on the Jutland peninsula in central Denmark. The municipality covered an area of 255 km^{2}, and had a total population of 13,953 (2005). Its last mayor was Hans-Jørgen Hørning, a member of the Venstre (Liberal Party) political party. The main town and the site of its municipal council was the town of Kjellerup.

Kjellerup municipality ceased to exist as the result of Kommunalreformen ("The Municipality Reform" of 2007). It was merged with existing Gjern, Silkeborg and Them, municipalities to form the new Silkeborg municipality. This created a municipality with an area of 857 km^{2} and a total population of 84,167 (2005). The new municipality belongs to Region Midtjylland ("Mid-Jutland Region").

The capital city was Kjellerup.
