= Thorning (town) =

- Town
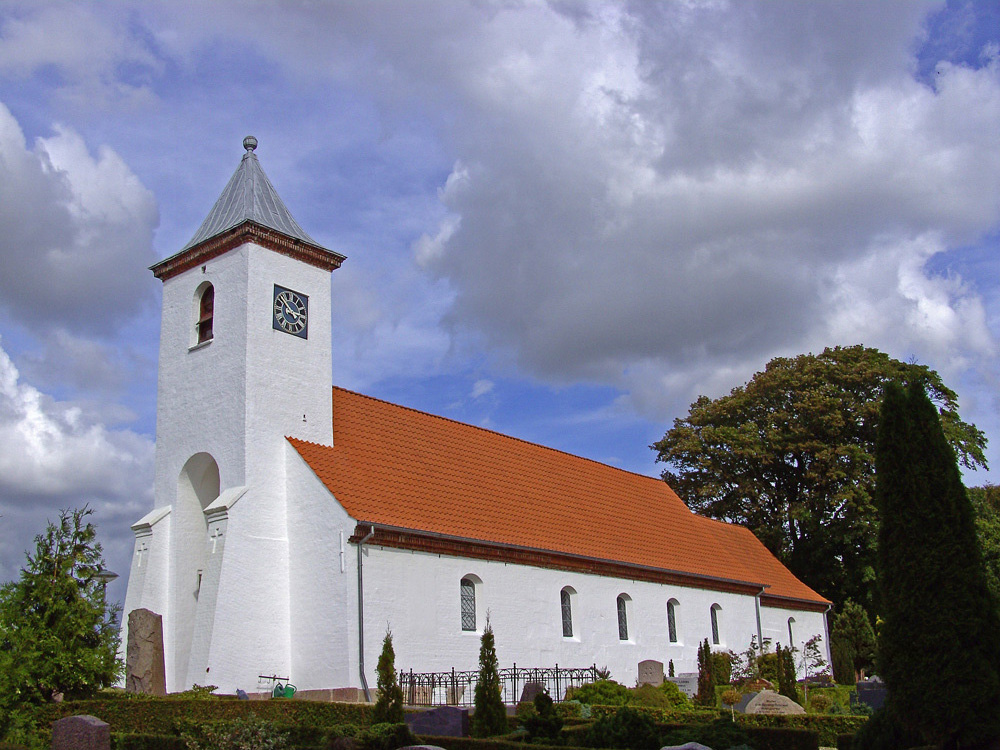
- Thorning Church

- Location in Denmark Thorning (Central Denmark Region)
- Coordinates: 56°17′11″N 9°19′56″E
- Country: Denmark
- Region: Region Midtjylland
- Municipality: Silkeborg Municipality
- Parish: Thorning Parish

Area
  - Urban: 0.96 km^{2} (0.37 sq mi)

Population (2026)
  - Urban: 1,013
  - Urban density: 1,100/km^{2} (2,700/sq mi)
- Time zone: UTC+1 (CET)
  - Summer (DST): UTC+2 (CEST)
- Postal code: DK-8620 Kjellerup

Thorning is a small town located in Silkeborg Municipality in Region Midtjylland in Jutland in central Denmark.

== Geography ==
Its territory has two differentiated zones: the southwestern part is occupied by the Kompedal Plantage forest while the northeastern part is dedicated to agriculture. It is characterized by the presence of gentle hills. Haller Å it runs through its southern part and Tange Sø runs through the central and north. The latter also passes next to the urban area. Nipgård Sø is also located north of the town.
