= Gjern =

- Town
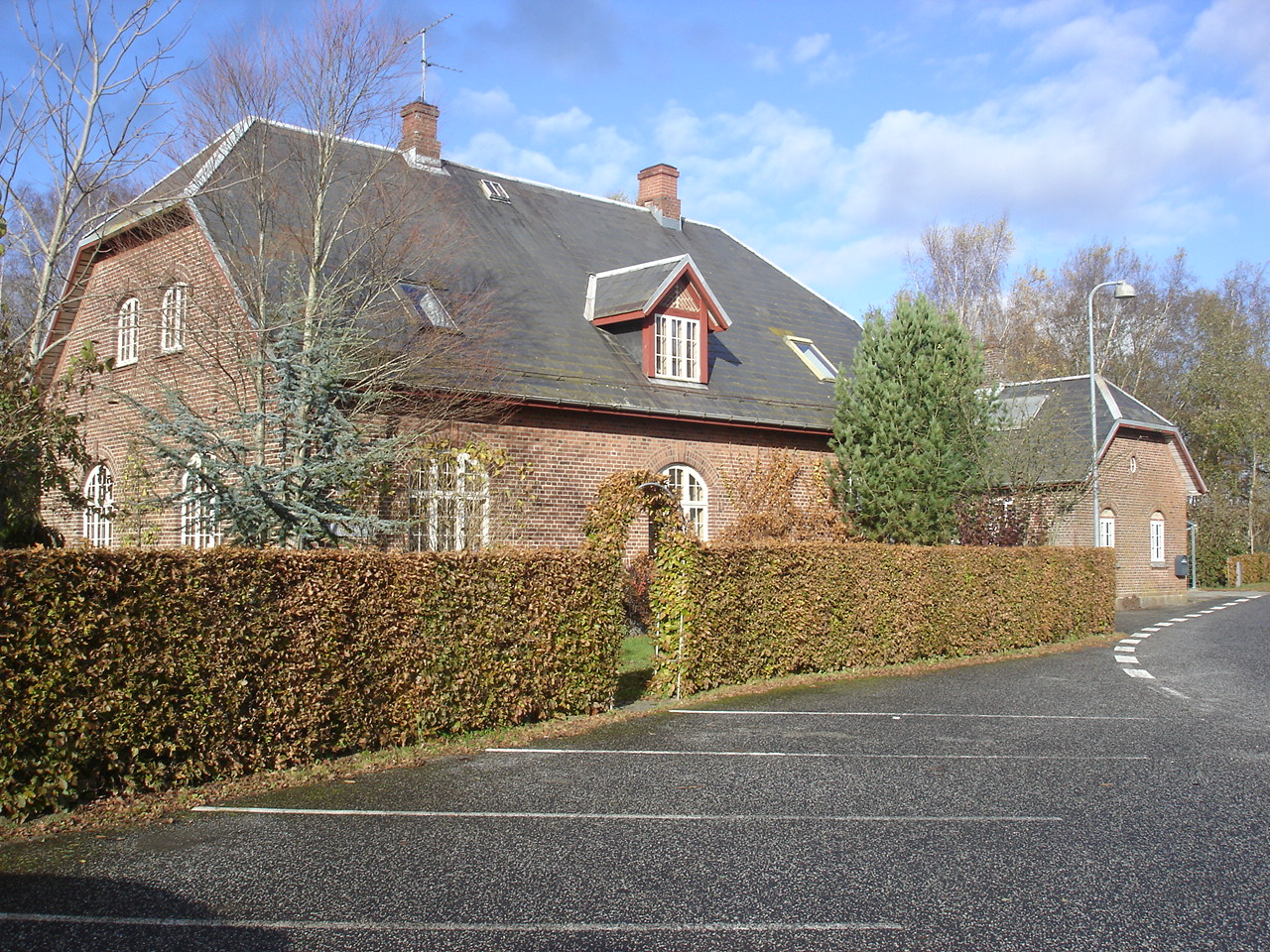
- The former Gjern Station seen from the roadside

- Location in Denmark Gjern (Central Denmark Region)
- Coordinates: 56°13′27″N 9°44′26″E
- Country: Denmark
- Region: Region Midtjylland
- Municipality: Silkeborg Municipality

Area
  - Urban: 1 km^{2} (0.39 sq mi)

Population (2026)
  - Urban: 1,553
  - Urban density: 1,600/km^{2} (4,000/sq mi)
- Time zone: UTC+1 (CET)
  - Summer (DST): UTC+2 (CEST)
- Postal code: DK-8883 Gjern

Gjern is a former railway town in central Denmark with a population of 1,553 (1 January 2026), located in Silkeborg Municipality in Region Midtjylland in Jutland, Denmark.

The town is the site of Jysk Automobilmuseum, a large museum of automobiles. Gjern has also a ski resort called Dayz Søhøjlandet Alpint Skicenter.
