= Kjellerup =

- Town
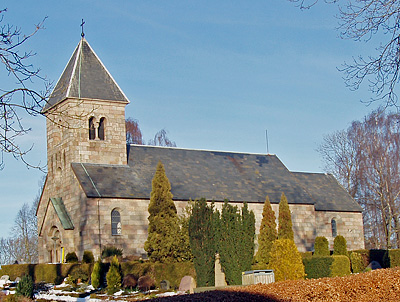
- Hørup Church in Kjellerup

- Location in Denmark Kjellerup (Central Denmark Region)
- Coordinates: 56°17′05″N 09°26′00″E
- Country: Denmark
- Region: Central Denmark (Midtjylland)
- Municipality: Silkeborg

Area
  - Urban: 3.9 km^{2} (1.5 sq mi)

Population (2026)
  - Urban: 5,295
  - Urban density: 1,400/km^{2} (3,500/sq mi)
  - Gender: 2,535 males and 2,760 females
- Time zone: UTC+1 (CET)
  - Summer (DST): UTC+2 (CEST)
- Postal code: 8620 Kjellerup

Kjellerup is a Danish town with a population of 5,295 (1 January 2026). It is located 17 km north of Silkeborg and 20 km south of Viborg in Central Jutland.

The town was the seat of the former Kjellerup Municipality.

== Notable people ==
- Ditlev Trappo Saugmand Bjerregaard (1852 in Højbjerg – 1916 in Kjellerup) a businessman, traditional musician and composer of traditional dance music, owned a music shop in Kjellerup
- Søren Malling (born 1964) a Danish actor, raised and lives in Kjellerup
- Henrik Vibskov (born 1972 in Kjellerup) a Danish fashion designer
- Henrik Pedersen (born 1975 in Kjellerup) a retired Danish footballer, 398 club caps and 3 for Denmark
- Svend-Allan Sørensen (born 1975) a conceptual artist of figured birds
- Thomas Holm (born 1978) singer-songwriter, born and raised in Kjellerup
- Janni Thomsen (born 2000), professional footballer for London City Lionesses
