= Fårvang =

- Town
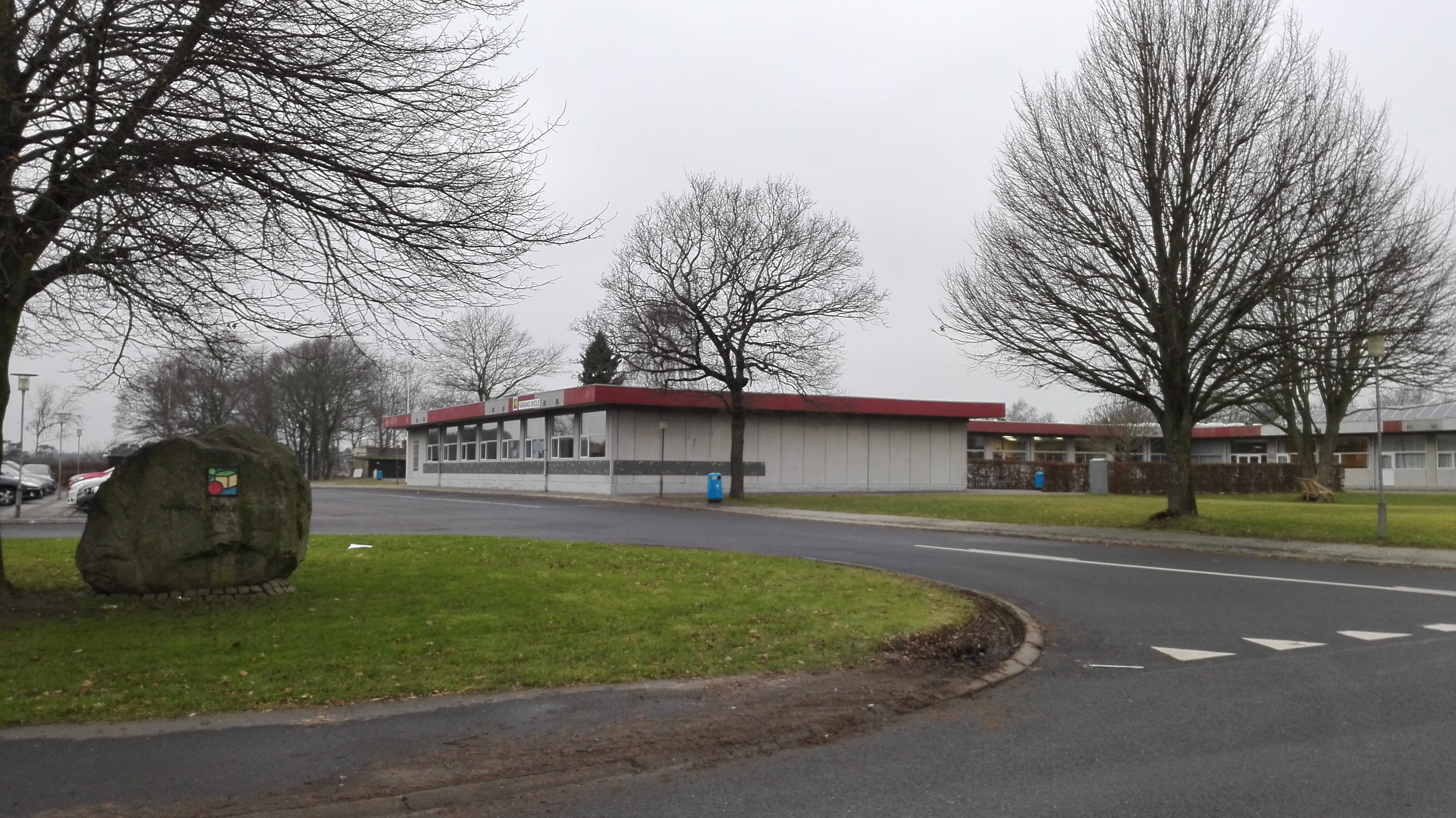
- Fårvang School

- Location within Denmark Location within Central Denmark Region
- Coordinates: 56°16′3″N 9°43′9″E
- Country: Denmark
- Region: Central Denmark (Midtjylland)
- Municipality: Silkeborg Municipality
- Parish: Tvilum Parish

Area
  - Urban: 1.1 km^{2} (0.42 sq mi)

Population (2026)
  - Urban: 1,428
  - Urban density: 1,300/km^{2} (3,400/sq mi)
- Time zone: UTC+1 (CET)
  - Summer (DST): UTC+2 (CEST)
- Postal code: DK-8882 Fårvang

Fårvang is a town, with a population of 1,428 (1 January 2026), in Silkeborg Municipality, Central Denmark Region in Denmark.

Fårvang is situated 33 km southeast of Viborg, 33 km southwest of Randers, 34 km northwest of Aarhus and 20 km northeast of Silkeborg.

The furniture manufacturer Tvilum A/S is located in the northwestern part of the town.

Solcellepark Fårvang is a new solar power plant located on the western outskirts of the town. It was scheduled to commence operation in February 2024.

== Notable people ==
- Martin Laursen (born 1977 in Fårvang), a former professional footballer.
