= Silkeborg Municipality =

Silkeborg Municipality Silkeborg Kommune (Danish)
- Municipality
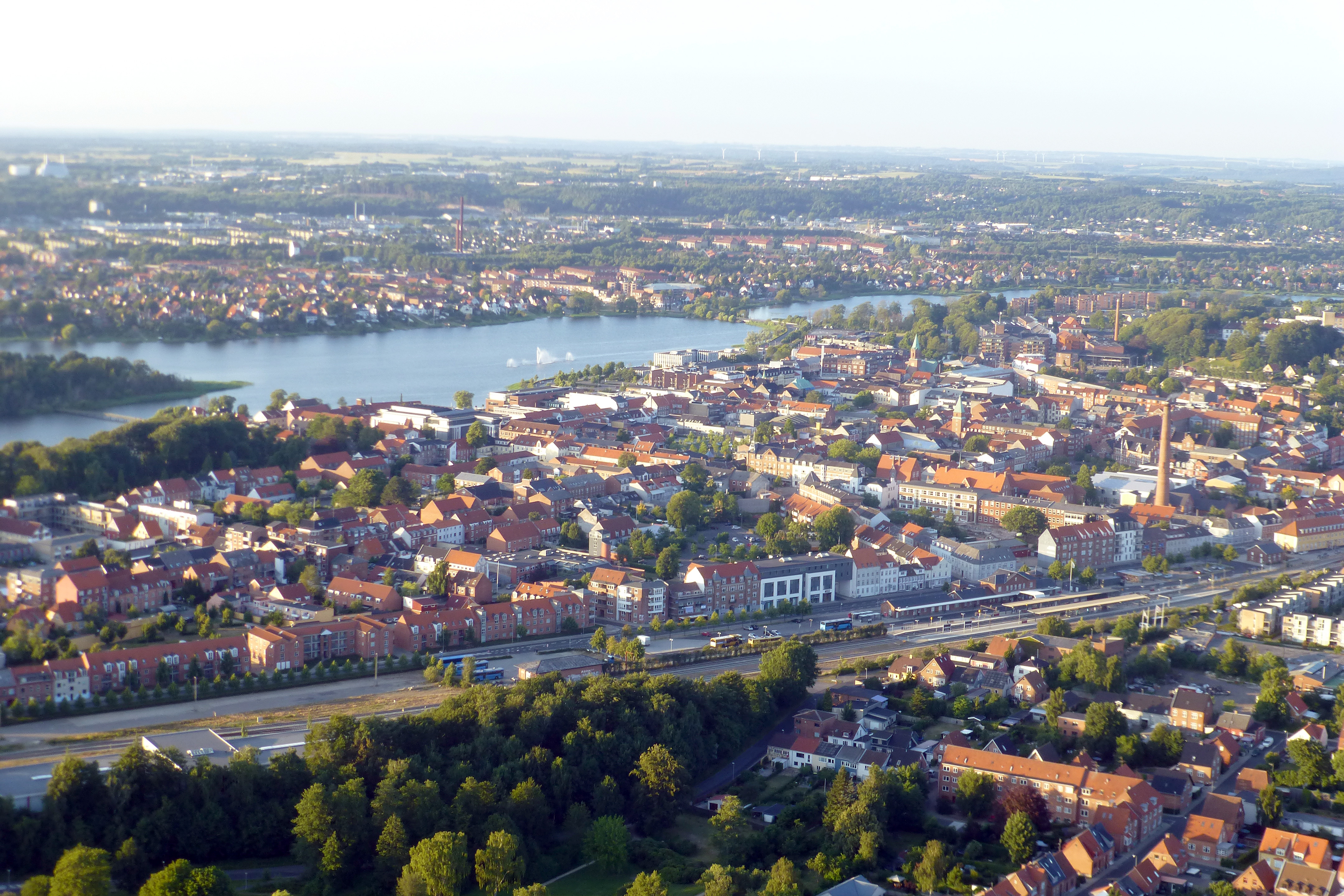

- Coat of arms

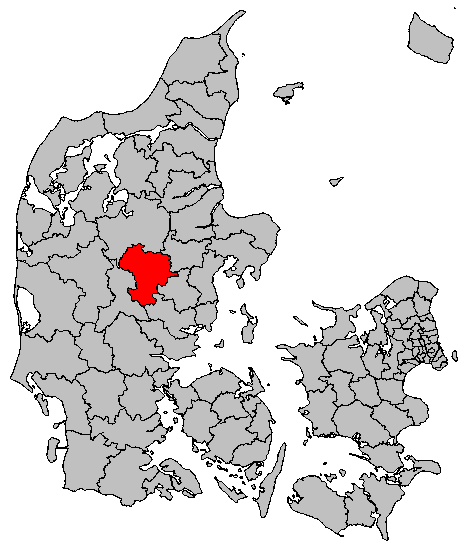
- Location in Denmark
- Coordinates: 56°10′42″N 9°33′05″E
- Country: Denmark
- Region: Central Denmark
- Established: 1 January 2007

Government
  - Mayor: Helle Gade

Area
  - Total: 857 km^{2} (331 sq mi)

Population (1 January 2026)
  - Total: 102,753
  - Density: 120/km^{2} (311/sq mi)
- Time zone: UTC+1 (CET)
  - Summer (DST): UTC+2 (CEST)
- Postal code: 8600
- Website: www.silkeborg.dk

Silkeborg Municipality (Danish: Silkeborg Kommune) is a municipality (Danish, kommune) in Region Midtjylland on the Jutland peninsula in central Denmark. The municipality covers an area of 857.16 km^{2}, and has a population of 102,753 (1 January 2026). Its mayor is Helle Gade, of the party Social Democrats (Denmark). The main town and the site of its municipal council is the town of Silkeborg.

On 1 January 2007, Silkeborg municipality was, as the result of Kommunalreformen ("The Municipal Reform" of 2007), merged with Gjern, Kjellerup, and Them municipalities to form the new Silkeborg municipality.

The municipality is part of Business Region Aarhus and of the East Jutland metropolitan area, which had a total population of 1.378 million in 2016.

== List of settlements ==
#	Settlement	Population (2010)	Population (2025)
1	Silkeborg	42,396	52,571
2	Kjellerup	4,794	5,247
3	Sejs-Svejbæk	3,842	4,677
4	Virklund	3,286	3,923
5	Them	2,225	2,448
6	Voel	1,347	1,965
7	Ans	1,728	1,906
8	Bryrup	1,605	1,624
9	Gjern	1,432	1,529
10	Fårvang	1,314	1,391
11	Sorring	1,058	1,165
12	Thorning	1,033	1,006

=== The town of Silkeborg ===
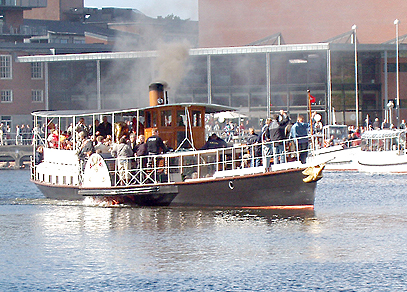
Hjejlen ("The Golden Plover") is an historic steamboat that sails from Silkeborg to Himmelbjerget.

The town of Silkeborg is divided into a northern and southern part by the lake, Silkeborg Langsø, which at the eastern side of the town, resolves into the Guden River (Gudenaa). Silkeborg was the home town of COBRA painter Asger Jorn, and has several interesting art museums and exhibitions, including Museum Jorn, Silkeborg with its large Asger Jorn collection.

== Politics ==
=== Municipal council ===
Silkeborg's municipal council consists of 31 members, elected every four years.

Below are the municipal councils elected since the Municipal Reform of 2007.

Election	Party												Total seats	Turnout	Elected mayor
Election	A	B	C	D	F	I	K	O	V	Æ	Ø	Å	Total seats	Turnout	Elected mayor
2005	11	1	2		3		1	1	12				31	71.8%	Jens Erik Jørgensen (C)
2009	10		3		6			2	10				31	68.6%	Hanne Bæk Olsen (A)
2013	9	1	2		2	1		3	11		2		31	76.3%	Steen Vindum (V)
2017	10	1	1		2	1		2	11		2	1	31	74.7%	Steen Vindum (V)
2021	10	2	6	1	2				8		2		31	73.3%	Helle Gade (A)
2025	10	1	3		3	2		1	7	2	2		31	73.9%	Helle Gade (A)
Data from Kmdvalg.dk 2005, 2009, 2013 and 2017 and 2021. Data from valg.dk 2025

== Sources ==
- Municipal statistics: NetBorger Kommunefakta, delivered from KMD a.k.a. Kommunedata (Municipal Data)
- Municipal mergers and neighbors: Eniro new municipalities map
- Searchable/printable municipality maps
